= List of shipwrecks in April 1945 =

The list of shipwrecks in April 1945 includes ships sunk, foundered, grounded, or otherwise lost during April 1945.

== 1 April ==
List of shipwrecks: 1 April 1945
Ship	State	Description
Adler	Kriegsmarine	World War II: The Adler-class gunnery training ship, a former Herluf Trolle-class coastal defence ship, was sunk at Kiel, Germany, by Allied aircraft.
Armenier	United Kingdom	The cargo ship (914 GRT, 1919) was scuttled off Littlehampton, Sussex, after service as a target ship.
Awa Maru	Japan	World War II: The Miike Maru-class Red Cross prisoner of war relief supply ship was torpedoed and sunk by the submarine USS Queenfish (United States Navy) while marked with illuminated white cross and after having been guaranteed safe passage by the Allies. There was only one survivor among the 2,005 people on board, rescued by Queenfish. The wreck was located at 24°40′N 119°45′E in 1977. Salvage work was done by China Salvage Company, with some remains and artifacts returned to Japan.
Crvena Zvijezda	Yugoslav Navy	World War II: The gunboat was sunk by a mine off Sansego in the Adriatic Sea, with the loss of 17 or 22 lives and 22 wounded.
Two Shin'yō suicide motorboats	Imperial Japanese Navy	World War II: Battle of Okinawa: The Shin'yō-class suicide motorboats were sunk in Nakagusuku Bay, Okinawa.
Uta	Kriegsmarine	World War II: The repair ship (628 GRT), a converted Kriemhild-class guard ship, was bombed by aircraft on the Danube River at km 1902 (near Orth an der Donau, Austria), burnt and sank. After the war she was raised, repaired and put in Soviet service as Angara.

== 2 April ==
List of shipwrecks: 2 April 1945
Ship	State	Description
Afterglow or Port Richard	United Kingdom	The sealer and former patrol vessel was blown from her moorings at Port Stanley, Falkland Islands, during a severe gale and wrecked on the southern shore (it is not known whether she had reverted to her civilian name after return from naval service in 1944).
CD-186	Imperial Japanese Navy	World War II: Convoy O-Shima Transport Unit: The Type D escort ship was sunk in the East China Sea south west of Amami Ōshima (28°07′N 129°09′E) by United States Navy aircraft from Task Force 58. 53 crew were killed and many more wounded. T-146 (Imperial Japanese Navy) rescued survivors.
Concordia	Norway	World War II: The cargo ship (5,154 GRT, 1940) was bombed and sunk in Sognefjord, Norway by de Havilland Mosquito aircraft of 143, 235, 248 and 333 Squadrons, Royal Air Force. Later raised, repaired and returned to service.
USS Dickerson	United States Navy	World War II: The high-speed transport, a former Wickes-class destroyer, was damaged in the Pacific Ocean off Okinawa, Japan by a kamikaze attack with the loss of 54 of her 101 crew. The ship was scuttled off Kerama Retto on 4 April.
Edogawa Maru	Japan	World War II: Convoy TAMO-51: The cargo ship was torpedoed and sunk in the Yellow Sea (34°02′N 124°00′E) by USS Sea Devil (United States Navy). Lost with all 48 crew.
Nisshin Maru	Japan	World War II: Convoy TAMO-51: The cargo ship was torpedoed and sunk in the Yellow Sea (34°02′N 124°00′E) by USS Sea Devil (United States Navy). Thirty-nine crew and nine gunners were killed.
R-256	Kriegsmarine	World War II: The Type R-218 minesweeper sank off Bornholm, Denmark, after being damaged during a Soviet air attack.
T-17	Imperial Japanese Navy	World War II: Convoy O-Shima Transport Unit: The No.1-class landing ship was sunk in the East China Sea southwest of Amami Ōshima (28°07′N 129°09′E) by United States Navy aircraft from Task Force 58. There were 49 dead and 80 wounded. T-146 rescued survivors.
Taijo Maru	Japan	World War II: Convoy TAMO-51: The cargo ship was torpedoed and sunk in the Yellow Sea (34°02′N 124°00′E) by USS Sea Devil (United States Navy). Thirty-nine crew and nine gunners were killed.
U-321	Kriegsmarine	World War II: The Type VIIC/41 submarine was depth charged and sunk in the Atlantic Ocean southwest of Ireland by a Vickers Wellington aircraft of 304 Squadron, Royal Air Force with the loss of all 41 crew.
UJ 1011	Kriegsmarine	World War II: The auxiliary submarine chaser was sunk by Soviet aircraft.
William Blumer	Norway	World War II: The cargo ship (3,604 GRT, 1920) was bombed and sunk in Sognefjord, Norway by de Havilland Mosquito aircraft of 143, 235, 248 and 333 Squadrons, Royal Air Force. She was raised on 12 October 1946, repaired and returned to service in April 1948 as William.

== 3 April ==
List of shipwrecks: 3 April 1945
Ship	State	Description
BK-244	Soviet Navy	World War II: The Project 1125-class armored motor gunboat was sunk by a mine in the Danube at km 1798, between Komárom and Bratislava.
Brummer	Kriegsmarine	World War II: The minelayer was wrecked in a Royal Air Force air raid on Kiel, Schleswig-Holstein.
Daijin Maru No. 1 Go	Imperial Japanese Navy	The auxiliary guard boat was lost on this date.
Hedgehog	Nazi Germany	World War II: The cargo ship was bombed and sunk at Kiel, Germany. The vessel was salvaged and returned to her owners, Shell Algiers, post war.
Heikai Maru	Imperial Japanese Navy	World War II: The transport was bombed and sunk four miles (6.4 km) southeast of Lamma Island, Hong Kong (22°17′N 114°10′E) by United States Far East Air Force Consolidated B-24 Liberator aircraft. A crewman was killed.
Irben	Kriegsmarine	World War II: The Lauting-class mine transport was sunk at Kiel by Allied aircraft.
Manju	Imperial Japanese Navy	World War II: The Etorofu-class escort ship was bombed and damaged by Far East Air Force Consolidated B-24 Liberator aircraft one mile (1.6 km) northeast of Green Island, Hong Kong. Her stern remained afloat with enough buoyancy that the vessel drifted near Stonecutter's Island, Hong Kong before the ship's bow sank to the bottom. 53 crew including her commanding officer and 1 passenger were killed with another 50 crewmen wounded. Salvage began on 7 April and the escort ship was fully refloated on 11 May and towed to Kowloon for repairs that were 90% finished at war's end.
USS S-16	United States Navy	The decommissioned S-class submarine was sunk as a target 14 miles (23 km) west south west of Key West, Florida (24°25′N 82°02′W) in 260 feet (79 m) of water.
Shozan Maru	Imperial Japanese Navy	World War II: The transport was bombed and sunk in Hong Kong Harbor by United States Far East Air Force Consolidated B-24 Liberator aircraft. Eight crewmen were killed.
T 111	Kriegsmarine	World War II: The training ship, a former G 7-class torpedo boat, was sunk at Kiel by United States aircraft.
U-1221	Kriegsmarine	World War II: The Type IXC/40 submarine was bombed and sunk at Kiel in an American air raid with the loss of seven of the eighteen crew on board at the time.
U-2542	Kriegsmarine	World War II: The Type XXI submarine was bombed and sunk at Kiel in an American air raid. The wreck was scrapped post-war.
U-3505	Kriegsmarine	World War II: The Type XXI submarine was bombed and sunk at Kiel in an American air raid with the loss of a crew member. The wreck was scrapped post-war.
Walter Kophamel	Kriegsmarine	World War II: The hospital ship, a former Monte-class passenger ship, was bombed, set afire and sank at Kiel in an American air raid. She was refloated on 12 June 1946 and scrapped in 1948.
USS YMS-71	United States Navy	World War II: The minesweeper (270 GRT) was sunk by a mine in the Celebes Sea off Sanga Sanga, Philippine Islands (04°59′N 119°47′E). Two crew were killed and 19 wounded.
Yokai Maru	Imperial Japanese Navy	World War II: The transport was bombed and sunk in Hong Kong Harbor by United States Far East Air Force Consolidated B-24 Liberator aircraft. Two crewmen were killed.

== 4 April ==
List of shipwrecks: 4 April 1945
Ship	State	Description
Axenfels	Germany	World War II: The cargo ship was bombed and sunk by American aircraft at Kiel, Schleswig-Holstein. Wreck scrapped in March 1948 at Blyth, Northumberland, United Kingdom.
Feodosia	Germany	World War II: The cargo ship was bombed, exploded and sunk by British aircraft in the Kattegat.
Franz Jurgen	Germany	World War II: The cargo ship was sunk in an Allied air raid on Kiel. She was refloated in May 1949, repaired and entered West German service.
Horei Maru	Imperial Japanese Navy	World War II: The Horei Maru-class salvage ship was destroyed by fire when Kinyu Maru No. 2 (Japan) was bombed and set on fire by North American B-25 Mitchell aircraft of the 498th and 500th Bomb Squadrons (345 Bomb Group) at Mako, Pescadore Islands (23°32′N 119°39′E).
Irben	Kriegsmarine	World War II: The Irben-class minelayer was sunk off Kiel by American aircraft.
Kinyu Maru No. 2	Japan	World War II: The tanker was bombed and set on fire and sunk by North American B-25 Mitchell aircraft of the 498th and 500th Bomb Squadrons (345 Bomb Group) at Mako, Pescadore Islands (23°32′N 119°39′E).
Kurt Ramien	Kriegsmarine	The Este-class naval trawler/trials ship was sunk on this date.
USS LCI(G)-82	United States Navy	World War II: The landing craft infantry (gun) (250 GRT was sunk off Buckner Bay, Okinawa by a Japanese suicide boat. Nine crew were killed.
USS LSM-12	United States Navy	The landing ship medium (743 GRT) was beached on Haguchi beach, Okinawa, when she was hit by USS LST-570 and then USS LST-675 (both United States Navy) in stormy conditions and flooded. There were no casualties but she was damaged beyond repairs and subsequently stripped for parts.
USS LST-675	United States Navy	The landing ship tank (1,625 GRT) was unable to retract from Haguchi beach, Okinawa, in stormy conditions. After coral pierced her bottom, her engine room flooded, she broached and was extensively damaged. No casualties were reported. She remained there until 25 May when she was finally towed from the beach for repairs, but was determined to be unsalvageable. She was decommissioned on 25 August 1945.
M-802	Kriegsmarine	World War II: The M 1943-class minesweeper was bombed and sunk by American aircraft at Kiel.
Mexphalte	Germany	World War II: The tanker was sunk in an American air raid on Kiel.
Mokuto	Imperial Japanese Navy	World War II: The Ukuru-class escort ship was mined and sunk in the Shimonoseki Strait (33°53′N 131°03′E). Twenty-seven crewmen were killed.
Monte Olivia	Germany	World War II: The hospital ship was bombed and sunk at Kiel by American aircraft.
New York	Germany	World War II: The ocean liner was bombed and sunk at Kiel by American aircraft. The wreck was scrapped from 2 August 1949 at Dalmuir, Scotland, and from January 1950 at Troon, Scotland.
R-59	Kriegsmarine	World War II: The Type R-41 minesweeper was sunk at Kiel by American aircraft.
R 119	Kriegsmarine	World War II: The Type R-41 minesweeper was sunk in an American air raid on Kiel.
R-261	Kriegsmarine	World War II: The Type R-218 minesweeper was sunk at Kiel by American aircraft.
T-145	Imperial Japanese Navy	World War II: The No.101-class landing ship was seriously damaged running aground on Derikyonma-Zaki (28°11′N 129°40′E). She was refloated on 11 April had to be abandoned as there was no hope for salvaging her.
T-155	Kriegsmarine	World War II: The depot ship, a former V-150-class torpedo boat, was sunk by Soviet aircraft at Schwiemunde.
Tokachi Maru	Imperial Japanese Navy	The auxiliary submarine chaser was sunk on this date.
U-237	Kriegsmarine	World War II: The Type VIIC submarine was bombed and sunk at Kiel in an American air raid with the loss of a crew member.
U-749	Kriegsmarine	World War II: The Type VIIC submarine was bombed and sunk at Kiel in an American air raid with the loss of two crew.
U-3003	Kriegsmarine	World War II: The Type XXI submarine was bombed and sunk at Kiel in an American air raid. The wreck was scrapped post-war.

== 5 April ==
List of shipwrecks: 5 April 1945
Ship	State	Description
Gasray	United Kingdom	World War II: The cargo ship (1,406 GRT, 1919) was torpedoed and sunk in the North Sea 2 nautical miles (3.7 km) north of St Abb's Head, Berwickshire by U-2321 (Kriegsmarine) with the loss of eight of her 24 crew. Survivors were rescued by Clova (United Kingdom) and the St Abb's lifeboat Royal National Lifeboat Institution.
Hardingham	United Kingdom	The cargo ship caught fire at Colombo, Ceylon and was abandoned by her crew. She subsequently exploded and sank. She was on a voyage from New York, United States to Calcutta, India.
Helmi Söhle	Kriegsmarine	World War II: the patrol boat was sunk in the Kattegat by de Havilland Mosquito aircraft of 143, 235, 248 and 333 Squadrons, Royal Air Force.
Kamoi	Japan	World War II: The oiler was bombed and damaged by United States Far East Air Force Consolidated B-24 Liberator aircraft at Hong Kong. She sank on 8 April in very shallow waters. The crew abandoned her on 13 April.
Kiho Maru No. 1 Go	Imperial Japanese Navy	The auxiliary guard boat was lost on this date.
Kine Maru	Imperial Japanese Navy	World War II: The cargo ship was bombed and sunk by Martin PBM Mariner aircraft of the United States Navy (22°24′N 115°28′E). Fifty-six passengers, five gunners and nineteen crew members were lost.
Rechnik Kubani BK-161	Soviet Navy	The Project 1124/No 41-class armored motor gunboat was lost on this date.
Ro-49	Imperial Japanese Navy	World War II: The Kaichū type submarine was depth charged and sunk in the Pacific Ocean off Okinawa by USS Hudson (United States Navy).
USS S-17	United States Navy	The decommissioned S-class submarine was sunk as a target.
Shinto Maru No. 2	Imperial Japanese Navy	World War II: The Shinto Maru No. 2-class auxiliary netlayer (540 GRT 1939) was shelled and sunk at Naha, Okinawa by US Army artillery. It is unknown if the ship remained beached or had been refloated. Three crew were killed.
Stutthof	Germany	World War II: The fishing trawler was sunk in the Kattegat by de Havilland Mosquito aircraft of 143, 235, 248 and 333 Squadrons, Royal Air Force.
USS Thornton	United States Navy	The seaplane tender (1,215 GRT), a former Clemson-class destroyer, collided with USS Ashtabula and USS Escalante (both United States Navy) in the Pacific Ocean off the Ryukyu Islands (24°42′N 129°12′E) and was severely damaged. Six crew were killed or lost overboard and not recovered. She was towed into Keramo Retto and after an inspection was beached, stripped of all useful materiel as needed, decommissioned and then abandoned.
Tokai Maru No. 2	Japan	World War II: The cargo ship was bombed and sunk by Consolidated B-24 Liberator, Martin B-26 Marauder and Lockheed P-38 Lightning aircraft of the United States Fifth Air Force (22°24′N 116°10′E). Sixteen gunners and thirteen crew members were lost.
Torridal	Norway	World War II: The cargo ship (1,381 GRT, 1930) was torpedoed and sunk at Folda, Norway by Utsira (Royal Norwegian Navy) with the loss of fifteen of her eighteen crew.
U-242	Kriegsmarine	World War II: The Type VIIC submarine struck a mine and sank in St George's Channel (52°02′54″N 5°46′48″W) with the loss of all 44 crew.

== 6 April ==
List of shipwrecks: 6 April 1945
Ship	State	Description
Amatsukaze	Imperial Japanese Navy	World War II: The Kagerō-class destroyer was bombed and damaged in the Strait of Formosa 6 nautical miles (11 km) east of Amoy, China (24°30′N 118°10′E) by North American B-25 Mitchell aircraft of the United States Army Air Force. She was beached at the entrance to Amoy harbor. Six officers and 150 men survived; 3 officers, 1 passenger, and 41 crew lost. On the evening of 8 April she is refloated by a storm, drifts across the harbor and grounds again at (23°55′N 117°40′E). Storms continue to batter her and she was scuttled with explosives on 10 April. The wreck is designated a bombing target and is expended for bombing training by the Japanese.
Araosan Maru	Japan	World War II: Convoy SASI-45: The cargo ship was torpedoed and sunk in the Strait of Formosa by USS Hardhead (United States Navy) with the loss of 57 lives.
USS Bush	United States Navy	World War II: The Fletcher-class destroyer was sunk in the Pacific Ocean off Okinawa, Japan (27°16′N 127°48′E) by a Japanese kamikaze attack with the loss of 87 of her 314 crew.
CD-1	Imperial Japanese Navy	World War II: Convoy HOMO-03: The Type C escort ship was sunk in Fotou Bay, China south west of Amoy (23°55′N 117°40′E) by North American B-25 Mitchell aircraft of the 345th Bomb Group, United States Army Air Force.
CD-134	Imperial Japanese Navy	World War II: Convoy HOMO-03: The Type D escort ship was sunk in Fotou Bay south west of Amoy (23°55′N 117°40′E) by North American B-25 Mitchell aircraft of the 345th Bomb Group, United States Army Air Force.
Captain Nathaniel B. Palmer	United States	World War II: The fishing vessel (36 GRT) was sunk 9 nautical miles (17 km) south south east of Block Island when a depth charge caught in her net exploded. Three crewmen were killed. The only survivor was rescued by the fishing vessel Mandalay (United States).
USS Colhoun	United States Navy	World War II: The Fletcher-class destroyer was sunk in the Pacific Ocean off Okinawa (27°16′N 127°48′E) when hit by four Japanese kamikaze aircraft. Thirty-five crewmen were killed.
Cuba	United Kingdom	World War II: Convoy VWP-16: The troopship (11,420 GRT, 1923) was torpedoed and sunk in the English Channel south east of the Isle of Wight (50°36′N 0°58′W) by U-1195 (Kriegsmarine) with the loss of one of the 265 people on board. Survivors were rescued by HMCS Nene (Royal Canadian Navy).
USS Emmons	United States Navy	World War II: The high-speed minesweeper, a former Gleaves-class destroyer, was damaged in a Japanese kamikaze attack in the Pacific Ocean off Okinawa (26°48′N 128°04′E) with the loss of 60 of her 208 crew. She was scuttled the next day.
Hobbs Victory	United States	World War II: The Victory ship (7,607 GRT) was damaged in a Japanese kamikaze attack at Okinawa (25°50′N 127°14′E) and took fire. 11 merchant sailors and two Armed Guard sailors were killed. The survivors abandoned the ammunition laden ship and were rescued by USS Serene and USS Success (both United States Navy). She exploded and sank early the next day.
USS LST-447	United States Navy	World War II: The Mk 2 landing ship tank (1,653 GRT) was heavily damaged at Kerama Retto, Japan (26°09′N 127°18′E) in a kamikaze attack and abandoned. There were five missing, 17 wounded, one of which died of his wounds, and 98 unhurt survivors. She sank the next day.
USS Leutze	United States Navy	World War II: The Fletcher-class destroyer (2,100 GRT) was heavily damaged in a Japanese kamikaze attack west of Okinawa. Her crew lost 7 killed and 34 wounded. She was towed to Kerama Retto anchorage for emergency repairs but waited here for three months to be repaired enough to return under steam to California. Repairs were halted following the end of war and she was scrapped in New Jersey in 1947.
Logan Victory	United States	World War II: The Victory ship (7,607 GRT) was sunk by a kamikaze attack off Kerama Retto, west of Okinawa. Twelve merchant sailors and 3 Armed Guards were killed.
Marco Brunner	Germany	World War II: The troopship was sunk off Väderöarna, Sweden, with the loss of around 700 from the 1,200 people on board.
USS Morris	United States Navy	World War II: The Sims-class destroyer was damaged by a Japanese Nakajima B5N kamikaze aircraft. She was subsequently declared a constructive total loss.
USS Newcomb	United States Navy	World War II: The Fletcher-class destroyer was damaged in a Japanese kamikaze attack. She was consequently declared a constructive total loss.
U-1195	Kriegsmarine	World War II: The Type VIIC submarine was depth charged and sunk in the English Channel south east of the Isle of Wight (50°33′17″N 0°56′09″W) by HMS Watchman (Royal Navy) with the loss of 32 crew. There were 18 survivors.
W-12	Imperial Japanese Navy	World War II: The No.7-class minesweeper was torpedoed and damaged off Komodo Island and beached (08°13′N 119°14′E), torpedoed again and sunk by USS Besugo (United States Navy).

== 7 April ==
List of shipwrecks: 7 April 1945
Ship	State	Description
Asashimo	Imperial Japanese Navy	World War II: Operation Ten-Go: The Yūgumo-class destroyer was torpedoed and sunk in the Pacific Ocean 150 nautical miles (280 km) south west of Nagasaki approximately 38°N 128°E, by aircraft based on USS San Jacinto (United States Navy) with the loss of all 328 crew.
Flensburg	Germany	World War II: The incomplete cargo ship was bombed and sunk at Pillau, East Prussia by Soviet aircraft.
HA-64 and HA-67	Imperial Japanese Navy	World War II: Battle of Okinawa: The Type C midget submarines were blown up to prevent capture in Unten Bay, Okinawa.
Hamakaze	Imperial Japanese Navy	World War II: Operation Ten-Go: The Kagerō-class destroyer was torpedoed and sunk in the Pacific Ocean 150 nautical miles (280 km) south west of Nagasaki (30°47′N 128°08′E) by aircraft based on USS San Jacinto (United States Navy). 100 crew members were killed and 45 wounded. Hatsushimo (Imperial Japanese Navy) rescued 257 survivors.
Isokaze	Imperial Japanese Navy	World War II: The Kagerō-class destroyer was damaged in the Pacific Ocean by aircraft of Task Force 58, United States Navy. She was scuttled with the loss of twenty of her 239 crew. Wreck located 2017/2018.
Isuzu	Imperial Japanese Navy	World War II: The Nagara-class cruiser was torpedoed and damaged in the Java Sea 80 nautical miles (150 km; 92 mi) north west of Bima, Dutch East Indies by USS Gabilan (United States Navy). She was then torpedoed and sunk by USS Charr (United States Navy) at 7°38′S 118°09′E. One hundred and ninety crewmen were killed. Four hundred and thirty-seven crewmen and her captain were rescued by Kari, and thirteen by W-34 (both Imperial Japanese Navy).
James W. Nesmith	United States	World War II: Convoy HX 346: The Liberty ship was torpedoed and damaged in the Irish Sea (53°24′N 4°48′W) by U-1024 (Kriegsmarine). All 82 people on board survived. She was beached at Holyhead, Anglesey, United Kingdom but was declared a constructive total loss. Post war scuttled in the North Sea off Wilhelmshaven, Germany with a load of chemical weapons.
Kasumi	Imperial Japanese Navy	World War II: Operation Ten-Go: The Yūgumo-class destroyer was bombed and damaged in the Pacific Ocean 150 nautical miles (280 km) south west of Nagasaki (approximately 38°N 128°E) by United States Navy aircraft. Scuttled by Fuyutsuki (Imperial Japanese Navy) with the loss of seventeen crewmen killed and 47 wounded.
HMS MTB 494	Royal Navy	World War II: The BPB 72'-class motor torpedo boat (43/51 t, 1944) was rammed and sunk in the North Sea by S 176 (Kriegsmarine). 14 crew were killed.
HMS MTB 5001	Royal Navy	World War II: The Fairmile D (modified) motor torpedo boat (90/107 t, 1944) was sunk in the North Sea by gunfire by a Kriegsmarine Schnellboot or was rammed and sunk by S 177 (Kriegsmarine). Three crew were killed.
Oldenburg	Germany	World War II: The cargo ship was sunk off Vadheim, Norway by Allied aircraft.
S 176	Kriegsmarine	World War II: The Type 1939/40 Schnellboot was sunk by HMS MTB 494, HMS MTB 493, and HMS MTB 497 (all Royal Navy), also suffering damage by ramming HMMTB 494. Five men were killed and the survivors were captured.
S 177	Kriegsmarine	World War II: The Type 1939/40 Schnellboot was sunk by HMS MTB 494, HMS MTB 493, and HMS MTB 497 (all Royal Navy), also suffering damage in a collision with HMMTB 493. The whole crew was rescued by S 174 (Kriegsmarine)
Yahagi	Imperial Japanese Navy	World War II: Operation Ten-Go: The Agano-class cruiser was bombed, torpedoed and sunk in the Pacific Ocean south of Kyushu, Japan by United States Navy aircraft with the loss of 446 crew members.
Yamato	Imperial Japanese Navy	World War II: Operation Ten-Go: The Yamato-class battleship was bombed, torpedoed and sunk in the Pacific Ocean south of Kyushu by United States Navy aircraft with the loss of 2,055 of her 2,332 crew.

== 8 April ==
List of shipwrecks: 8 April 1945
Ship	State	Description
Albert	Germany	World War II: The cargo ship was bombed and wrecked by aircraft at Hamburg, Germany. Wreck scrapped in January 1950.
Boelcke	Luftwaffe	World War II: The Karl Meyer-class seaplane tender was sunk by Soviet aircraft off Hela, Danzig-West Prussia.
Franken	Kriegsmarine	World War II: The auxiliary ship was bombed and sunk by Soviet bombers off Hela.
Hans Albrecht Wedel	Luftwaffe	World War II: The Hans Albrecht Wedel-class seaplane tender was sunk by Soviet aircraft.
USS PGM-18	United States Navy	World War II: The PGM-9-class gunboat was mined in Buckner Bay, Okinawa and sank with a loss of 14 of her crew, some of them aboard the YMS-103 (United States Navy) that was mined while rescuing them. 14 of the 50 survivors were wounded.
Ritsu Go	Japan	World War II: The cargo ship was torpedoed and sunk in the East China Sea by USS Spadefish (United States Navy).
S 202	Kriegsmarine	World War II: The Type 1939/40 Schnellboote sank after a collision in the North Sea with S 703 Kriegsmarine whilst engaging Royal Navy motor torpedo boats. Six crewmen were killed and the survivors were captured.
S 223	Kriegsmarine	World War II: The Type 1939/40 Schnellboot was sunk at Hoofden by a mine. 20 crewmen were killed. Only nine men survived.
S 202	Kriegsmarine	World War II: The Type 1939/40 Schnellboote sank after a collision in the North Sea with S 202 Kriegsmarine whilst engaging Royal Navy motor torpedo boats. Seven crewmen were killed and the survivors were captured.
Tama Maru	Imperial Japanese Navy	The auxiliary submarine chaser was sunk on this date.
Tamon Maru No.12	Japan	World War II: The cargo ship struck a mine and sank off Shanghai, China.
U-774	Kriegsmarine	World War II: The Type VIIC submarine was depth charged and sunk in the Atlantic Ocean south west of Ireland (49°58′N 11°51′W) by HMS Bentinck and HMS Calder (both Royal Navy) with the loss of all 44 crew.
U-1001	Kriegsmarine	World War II: The Type VIIC/41 submarine was depth charged and sunk in the Atlantic Ocean south west of Land's End, Cornwall, United Kingdom (49°19′N 10°23′W) by HMS Byron and HMS Fitzroy (both Royal Navy) with the loss of all 46 crew.
UJ 301	Kriegsmarine	World War II: The submarine chaser was bombed and set afire in a Soviet air raid on Hela. She was towed out of the port and scuttled by R 71 (Kriegsmarine).
Vale	Germany	World War II: The cargo ship was sunk by Soviet aircraft.
Weserstein	Germany	World War II: The cargo ship was sunk by Soviet aircraft.
Wilhelm Bauer	Kriegsmarine	World War II: The submarine tender was bombed and sunk by Allied aircraft.
USS YMS-103	United States Navy	World War II: The minesweeper was heavily damaged by a mine off Okinawa (26°13′N 127°54′E). Five of her 32 crew were killed. She was beached and abandoned as a total loss.

== 9 April ==
List of shipwrecks: 9 April 1945
Ship	State	Description
Admiral Scheer	Kriegsmarine	Admiral Scheer World War II: The Deutschland-class cruiser was sunk in a Royal Air Force air raid on Kiel, Schleswig-Holstein.
Albert Jensen	Kriegsmarine	World War II: The cargo ship was bombed and sunk in the Baltic Sea off Hela, Danzig-West Prussia by Soviet aircraft. She was raised post-war, repaired and entered Soviet service as Professor Popov.
Carsten Russ	Germany	World War II: The cargo ship was bombed and sunk in the Skagerrak by British aircraft.
Charles Henderson	United States	World War II: The Liberty ship exploded and sank at Bari, Apulia, Italy when her cargo of 2,000 tons of bombs detonated. There were 360 killed and 1,730 wounded in the port.
F 165	Kriegsmarine	The Type A Marinefährprahm was sunk on this date.
Florida	Kriegsmarine	World War II: The target ship was bombed and sunk in the Baltic Sea (54°06′N 11°07′E) by Soviet aircraft with the loss of four lives. The wreck was raised in 1952.
HMS LCP(R) 738	Royal Navy	The landing craft personnel (ramp) (5,9/8,2 t, 1943) foundered in a storm in the Mediterranean Sea.
Lucia C.	Italy	World War II: The cargo ship sank at Bari due to damage sustained from the explosion of Charles Henderson (United States) with the loss of 360 lives. She was later salvaged and scrapped.
M-19	Kriegsmarine	World War II: The M-class minesweeper was bombed off Kiel and was beached.
M-504	Kriegsmarine	World War II: The Type 1916 minesweeper was bombed and sunk by British aircraft at Kiel.
Mendoza	Germany	World War II: The cargo ship was bombed and sunk off Pillau by Soviet aircraft.
Nikko Maru	Japan	Nikko Maru World War II: The troop ship was torpedoed and sunk in the Yellow Sea north-east of Qingdao, China (36°50′N 123°55′E), by USS Tirante (United States Navy). A total of 563 passengers, fourteen gunners, sixteen guard force soldiers, two signallers, and 73 crewmen were killed.
Ro-56	Imperial Japanese Navy	World War II: The Kaichū VI type submarine was depth charged and sunk off Okinodaito-Jima, Ryukyu (26°09′N 130°21′E), by USS Mertz and USS Monssen (both United States Navy). Lost with all 79 hands.
H43 Rosario	Kriegsmarine	World War II: The transport ship was damaged in an Allied air raid on Hamburg.
Rosnaes	Denmark	World War II: The cargo ship was seized by the Danish Resistance off Copenhagen and ran aground on Ven, Sweden. She was refloated and taken to Landskrona. Nineteen other Danish vessels were also seized and taken to Sweden to prevent their capture by German forces.
Samida	United Kingdom	World War II: Convoy TBC 123: The Liberty ship (7,219 GRT, 1943) was torpedoed and sunk in the English Channel off Dungeness, Kent by U-5363 (Kriegsmarine).
Saint Mihiel	United States	World War II: Convoy CU 65: The T2 tanker collided with Nashbulk (United States) in the Atlantic Ocean (37°44′N 64°40′W), caught fire and was abandoned.
U-677	Kriegsmarine	World War II: The Type VIIC submarine was destroyed at Hamburg in a British air raid.
U-747	Kriegsmarine	World War II: The Type VIIC submarine was badly damaged by bombs at Hamburg in an American air raid. She was scuttled on 3 May 1945.
U-804	Kriegsmarine	World War II: The Type IXC/40 submarine was sunk in the Kattegat off Gothenburg, Sweden (57°58′N 11°15′E) by de Havilland Mosquito aircraft of 143 Squadron and 235 Squadron, Royal Air Force with the loss of all 55 crew.
U-843	Kriegsmarine	World War II: The Type IXC/40 submarine was sunk in the Kattegat west of Gothenburg (57°32′N 11°23′E) by a rocket attack by de Havilland Mosquito aircraft of 235 Squadron, Royal Air Force with the loss of 44 of her 56 crew.
U-982	Kriegsmarine	World War II: The Type VIIC submarine was bombed and destroyed at Hamburg in a Royal Air Force air raid.
U-1065	Kriegsmarine	World War II: The Type VIIC/41 submarine was sunk in the Skaggerak (57°58′N 11°15′E) by a rocket attack by de Havilland Mosquito aircraft of 143 and 235 Squadrons, Royal Air Force with the loss of all 45 crew.
U-2509	Kriegsmarine	World War II: The Type XXI submarine was bombed and sunk at Hamburg in a Royal Air Force air raid.
U-2514	Kriegsmarine	World War II: The Type XXI submarine was bombed and sunk at Hamburg in a Royal Air Force air raid.
U-2516	Kriegsmarine	World War II: The Type XXI submarine was sunk at Kiel in a British air raid. The wreck was scrapped post-war.
U-2550	Germany	World War II: The submarine was destroyed in a British air raid on Hamburg.
U-3512	Kriegsmarine	World War II: The Type XXI submarine was bombed and sunk at Kiel in a British air raid.
UJ 1101 Alemania	Kriegsmarine	World War II: The submarine chaser was sunk in a Soviet air raid on Hela.
Vale	Germany	World War II: The cargo ship was bombed and sunk in the Baltic Sea off Pillau by Soviet aircraft.
W-3	Imperial Japanese Navy	World War II: The No.1-class minesweeper was torpedoed and sunk off Ofunato (39°07′S 141°57′E), by USS Parche (United States Navy).
USAT Y-17	United States Army	World War II: Convoy TAC 90: The tanker was sunk in the Scheldt by a Kriegsmarine Seehund midget submarine.

== 10 April ==
List of shipwrecks: 10 April 1945
Ship	State	Description
CHa-199	Imperial Japanese Navy	World War II: The CHa-1-class auxiliary submarine chaser was sunk off Matsure Light by mines.
General Osorio	Germany	World War II: The accommodation ship was sunk at Kiel, Schleswig-Holstein in a British air raid. She was refloated on 29 August 1947 and scrapped 1947–48.
Hansa I	Germany	World War II: The cargo ship was bombed and sunk off Gothenburg, Sweden by British aircraft.
Hosei Maru	Japan	World War II: The oiler was torpedoed and sunk in the Sunda Strait (05°25′S 106°39′E) by HNLMS O 19 (Royal Netherlands Navy). Nine passengers died. 29 passengers and all 9 crew members were rescued.
Ilmenau	Germany	World War II: The cargo ship was torpedoed and sunk in the Baltic Sea west of Liepāja, Latvia by Shch-310 (Soviet Navy). Fifty bombs on board were detonated during the BALTOPS 25 exercise from 5 to 20 June 2025.
M 504	Kriegsmarine	World War II: The minesweeper was sunk at Kiel in a British air raid.
HMS ML 102	Royal Navy	World War II: The motor launch was torpedoed and sunk in the English Channel off Dover, Kent by a Kriegsmarine midget submarine.
HMS MTB 710	Royal Navy	World War II: The Fairmile D motor torpedo boat (90/107 t, 1943) was sunk by a mine off Zara, Italy. 16 crew members were killed.
Neuwerk	Germany	World War II: The refugee ship was torpedoed and sunk off the Hel Peninsula, Danzig-West Prussia by S 708 (Kriegsmarine) with the loss of about 960 lives. There were eight survivors.
R-69	Kriegsmarine	World War II: The Type R-41 minesweeper was sunk off Hel, Danzig-West Prussia by Soviet aircraft.
T1	Kriegsmarine	World War II: The Type 35 torpedo boat was bombed and sunk by aircraft while docked at the Deutsche Werke yard in Kiel. Nine crew were killed.
T13	Kriegsmarine	World War II: The Type 37 torpedo boat was bombed and sunk by aircraft in the Kattegat. 20 crew were killed.
U-878	Kriegsmarine	World War II: The Type IXC/40 submarine was depth charged and sunk in the Bay of Biscay west of Saint-Nazaire, Loire-Inférieure, France (47°35′N 10°33′W) by HMS Tintagel Castle and HMS Vanquisher (both Royal Navy) with the loss of all 51 crew.
Weser	Kriegsmarine	World War II: The incomplete auxiliary aircraft carrier, a former Admiral Hipper-class cruiser, was scuttled at Kiel.

== 11 April ==
List of shipwrecks: 11 April 1945
Ship	State	Description
Agata Maru	Imperial Japanese Navy	World War II: The Agata Maru-class auxiliary transport was sunk in the Andaman Sea 11 miles (18 km) north east of Car Nicobar (09°21′N 93°00′E) by Consolidated B-24 Liberator aircraft of 203 Squadron, Royal Air Force.
CH-7	Imperial Japanese Navy	World War II: The No.4-class submarine chaser was sunk in the Andaman Sea 11 miles north east of Car Nicobar (09°21′N 93°00′E) by Consolidated B-24 Liberator aircraft of 203 Squadron, Royal Air Force.
Hinode Maru No. 17 Go	Imperial Japanese Navy	World War II: The auxiliary minesweeper was torpedoed and sunk in the East China Sea by USS Spadefish (United States Navy).
M-376	Kriegsmarine	World War II: The M 1940-class minesweeper was sunk off Hel, Danzig-West Prussia by Soviet aircraft.
Moltkefels	Germany	World War II: The cargo ship was bombed by Soviet aircraft off Hel and was beached with the loss of 500 lives. She was declared a total loss.
M 2	Kriegsmarine	World War II: The minesweeper was sunk in Fedefjord by aircraft of Coastal Command, Royal Air Force.
HMS MTB 362 (1)	Royal Navy	World War II: The motor torpedo boat was torpedoed and sunk in the English Channel east of Dungeness, Kent by a Kriegsmarine Seehund midget submarine.
Panama	United Kingdom	World War II: The cargo ship (6,650 GRT, 1915) capsized and sank in the Atlantic Ocean (44°30′N 33°30′W with the loss of 45 of her 50 crew.
Port Wyndham	Germany	World War II: Convoy UC 63B: The cargo ship was torpedoed and sunk in the English Channel east of Dungeness by U-5070 (Kriegsmarine).
Posen	Kriegsmarine	World War II: The hospital ship was bombed and sunk by Soviet aircraft off Hela. 300 killed.
Ramona	Sweden	World War II: The fishing lugger was shelled and sunk in the Baltic Sea south of the Utklippan Lighthouse by K-56 (Soviet Navy). One crew was killed.
Tamasono Maru No. 2 Go	Imperial Japanese Navy	The auxiliary minesweeper was lost on this date.
Togo Maru	Imperial Japanese Navy	World War II: The auxiliary minesweeper was torpedoed and sunk in the Pacific Ocean off the Japanese coast by USS Parche (United States Navy).
TS-10	Kriegsmarine	World War II: The minesweeper was bombed and sunk by Soviet aircraft off Hela.
UJ 1102	Kriegsmarine	World War II: The submarine chaser was bombed and sunk off Hela by Soviet aircraft.

== 12 April ==
List of shipwrecks: 12 April 1945
Ship	State	Description
Dione	Norway	World War II: De Havilland Mosquito aircraft of 143, 235, 248 and 333 Squadrons, Royal Air Force bombed and sank the cargo ship (1,596 GRT, 1940) at Porsgrunn, Norway. Raised post-war, repaired and returned to service in April 1946.
Kalmar	Germany	World War II: De Havilland Mosquito aircraft of 143, 235, 248 and 333 Squadrons, Royal Air Force bombed and sank the cargo ship at Porsgrunn.
USS LCS(L)-33	United States Navy	World War II: Japanese kamikazes sank the landing craft support off Okinawa. Of the 73 men aboard, one was killed, three missing, 29 seriously wounded and 40 were rescued lightly wounded or unhurt.
USS LCT-66	United States Navy	The landing craft tank was lost at Pearl Harbor, Hawaii.
USS LST-493	United States Navy	The landing ship tank ran aground and sank off Plymouth, Devon, United Kingdom (50°20′N 04°09′W).
USS Mannert L. Abele	United States Navy	World War II: A Japanese kamikaze attack using an Aichi D3A or Yokosuka MXY7 Ohka aircraft sank the Allen M. Sumner-class destroyer in the Pacific Ocean 70 nautical miles (130 km) north west of Okinawa (27°15′00″N 136°30′00″E). USS LSM(R)-189 and USS LSM(R)-190 (both United States Navy), rescued the survivors.
Nordsjø	Norway	World War II: De Havilland Mosquito aircraft of 143, 235, 248 and 333 Squadrons, Royal Air Force bombed and sank the coaster (178 GRT, 1868) at Porsgrunn, Norway. Raised post-war, repaired and returned to service.
Ro-64	Imperial Japanese Navy	World War II: A mine sank the Japanese Type L submarine in Hiroshima Bay, Japan while she was on a training mission. Eighty people were killed.
Shiratori Maru	Imperial Japanese Navy	World War II: The auxiliary submarine chaser was torpedoed and sunk in the Pacific Ocean south of Honshu by USS Silversides (United States Navy).
German ship Sperrbrecher 36 Eider (2)	Germany	World War II: The target ship was bombed, exploded and capsized at Wilhelmshaven in an Allied air raid. She was later righted.
Traust	Norway	World War II: De Havilland Mosquito aircraft of 143, 235, 248 and 333 Squadrons, Royal Air Force bombed and sank the coaster (222 GRT, 1921) at Porsgrunn, Norway. Raised post-war, repaired and returned to service.
U-486	Kriegsmarine	World War II: The Type VIIC submarine was torpedoed and sunk in the North Sea north west of Bergen, Norway (60°44′N 4°39′E) by HMS Tapir (Royal Navy) with the loss of all 48 crew.
U-1024	Kriegsmarine	World War II: The Type VIIC/41 submarine was damaged in the Irish Sea south of the Isle of Man (53°39′N 5°03′W by a Squid attack by HMS Loch Glendhu and HMS Loch More (both Royal Navy) with the loss of nine of her 46 crew. HMS Loch More took U-1024 in tow but she foundered the next day.
Wa-104	Imperial Japanese Navy	World War II: The Wa-101-class auxiliary minesweeper was sunk south west of Bali, Netherlands East Indies (08°55′S 115°15′E) by HMS Stygian (Royal Navy).
Weserstein	Germany	World War II: Soviet aircraft bombed and sank the cargo ship in the port of Pillau, East Prussia.
Will Rogers	United States	World War II: Convoy BB 80: U-1024 (Kriegsmarine) torpedoed the Liberty ship in the Irish Sea south west of Holyhead, Anglesey, United Kingdom (53°48′N 4°46′W). Her crew beached their damaged ship at Holyhead. Later repaired and returned to service on 1 December 1945.
USS Zellars	United States Navy	World War II: The Allen M. Sumner-class destroyer was severely damaged off Okinawa, Japan by a kamikaze attack. She was out of action for the rest of the war.

== 13 April ==
List of shipwrecks: 13 April 1945
Ship	State	Description
F 961	Kriegsmarine	The Type D Marinefährprahm was sunk by Allied fighter-bombers near Fiume, Italy.
Kasuga Maru	Imperial Japanese Navy	The auxiliary submarine chaser was sunk on this date.
Karlsruhe	Germany	World War II: The cargo ship was bombed and sunk by Soviet Douglas A-20 Havoc aircraft off the Hel Peninsula, Poland. 970 killed.
Kosho Maru No. 2 Go	Imperial Japanese Navy	World War II: The auxiliary guard boat was torpedoed and sunk in the Pacific Ocean by USS Parche (United States Navy).
Misago Maru No. 1	Imperial Japanese Navy	World War II: The auxiliary minesweeper was torpedoed and sunk in the Pacific Ocean off the Japanese coast by USS Parche (United States Navy).
Ostland	Germany	World War II: The cargo ship struck a mine off Anholt, Denmark and was severely damaged. She put in to Aarhus, Denmark. She was repaired post-war and entered Norwegian service in 1945 as Ferngulf.
T16	Kriegsmarine	World War II: The Type 37 torpedo boat was bombed and sunk by Allied aircraft at Fredrikshavn, Denmark.
TA45	Kriegsmarine	World War II: The Ariete-class torpedo boat was sunk in the Adriatic Sea by HMMTB 670 and HMMTB 697 (both Royal Navy).

== 14 April ==
List of shipwrecks: 14 April 1945
Ship	State	Description
Belgian Airman	Belgium	World War II: The cargo ship was torpedoed and sunk off Chesapeake Bay, Maryland, United States (36°09′N 74°05′W) by U-857 (Kriegsmarine) with the loss of one of her 47 crew. Survivors were rescued by Harold A. Jordan (United States).
CD-31	Imperial Japanese Navy	World War II: Convoy MOSHI-02: The Type C escort ship was torpedoed in the stern by a dud that started a fire, later she capsized and sank in Hiyo Inlet, Saishu Island (33°25′N 126°15′E), by USS Tirante (United States Navy). The vessel sank in shallow water and was only partially submerged. Thirty-nine crewmen were killed. 166 survivors were rescued by islanders, later picked up by CD-104 and Aguni (both Imperial Japanese Navy).
Goenoeng Telang	Japan	World War II: The fishing vessel was shelled and sunk in the Indian Ocean by HNLMS O 24 (Royal Netherlands Navy).
Juzan Maru	Imperial Japanese Navy	World War II: Convoy MOSHI-02: The Juzan Maru-class auxiliary transport (3,943 GRT 1941) (a.k.a. Jusan Maru) was torpedoed and sunk in Hiyo Inlet, Saishu Island (33°25′N 126°15′E), by USS Tirante (United States Navy). Thirty-three crewmen were killed. 166 survivors were rescued by CD-104 and Aguni (both Imperial Japanese Navy).
Kako Go	Japan	World War II: The coaster was torpedoed and sunk in the Java Sea by USS Gabilan (United States Navy).
Nomi	Imperial Japanese Navy	World War II: Convoy MOSHI-02: The Mikura-class escort ship was torpedoed causing her forward magazine to explode, she jackknifed, broke in two and sank in Hiyo Inlet, Saishu Island (33°25′N 126°15′E), by USS Tirante (United States Navy). The vessel sank in shallow water and was only partially submerged. One hundred and thirty-four crewmen were killed including her captain. 87 survivors were rescued by islanders, later picked up by CD-104 and Aguni (both Imperial Japanese Navy).
R-126	Kriegsmarine	World War II: The Type R-41 minesweeper was sunk in The Great Belt by mines.
Shonan Maru No. 1	Japan	World War II: The coaster was torpedoed and sunk in the Java Sea by USS Gabilan (United States Navy).
TK-184 Morshanskiy Zheleznodorozhnik	Soviet Navy	The D-3-class motor torpedo boat was lost on this date.
U-235	Kriegsmarine	World War II: The Type VIIC submarine was depth charged and sunk in the Kattegat (57°44′N 10°39′E by T17 (Kriegsmarine) with the loss of all 47 crew.
U-1206	Kriegsmarine	The Type VIIC submarine was lost in the North Sea (57°24′N 1°37′W) in a diving accident with the loss of four of her 50 crew.

== 15 April ==
List of shipwrecks: 15 April 1945
Ship	State	Description
CHa-151	Imperial Japanese Navy	The CHa-1-class auxiliary submarine chaser was wrecked in the Pescadore Islands.
DB 06 Nanny	Kriegsmarine	The guard ship was lost on this date.
HMS Ekins	Royal Navy	World War II: The Captain-class frigate (1,432/1,823 t, 1943) was severely damaged by a mine in the North Sea. Declared a constructive total loss.
M-368	Kriegsmarine	World War II: The M 1940-class minesweeper was sunk in a collision with a U-boat off Southern Norway.
Shincho Maru	Japan	World War II: The hulk of the Standard 1TM tanker was raised and resunk at the entrance to Takao Harbour, Formosa.
Shonan Maru no. 1 Go	Imperial Japanese Navy	The auxiliary submarine chaser was sunk on this date.
U-103	Kriegsmarine	World War II: The decommissioned Type IXB submarine was bombed and sunk at Kiel, Schleswig-Holstein in an air raid with the loss of one life.
U-285	Kriegsmarine	World War II: The Type VIIC submarine was depth charged and sunk in the Atlantic Ocean south west of Ireland (50°13′N 12°48′W) by HMS Grindall and HMS Keats (both Royal Navy) with the loss of all 44 crew.
U-1063	Kriegsmarine	World War II: The Type VIIC/41 submarine was depth charged and sunk in the Atlantic Ocean off Land's End, Cornwall, United Kingdom (50°08′54″N 3°53′24″W) by HMS Loch Killin (Royal Navy) with the loss of 29 of her 46 crew.
U-1235	Kriegsmarine	World War II: The Type IXC/40 submarine was depth charged and sunk in the Atlantic Ocean by USS Frost and USS Stanton (both United States Navy) with the loss of all 57 crew.
Venus	Germany	World War II: The target ship was sunk in an Allied air raid on Hamburg. She was refloated post-war, repaired, and returned to Norwegian service on 3 May 1948.
Vs-58	Kriegsmarine	World War II: The Vorpostenboot struck a mine and sank in the Baltic Sea north-east of Kiel, Schleswig-Holstein (54°32′N 10°38′E).

== 16 April ==
List of shipwrecks: 16 April 1945
Ship	State	Description
Athelduke	United Kingdom	World War II: Convoy FS 1784: The tanker (8,966 GRT, 1929) was torpedoed and sunk in the North Sea east of Newcastle upon Tyne (55°38′50″N 1°30′30″W) by U-1274 (Kriegsmarine) with the loss of one of her 47 crew.
USS Bryant	United States Navy	World War II: The Fletcher-class destroyer was severely damaged off Okinawa, Japan by a kamikaze attack with the loss of 34 of her crew. She was out of action for the rest of the war.
CD-73	Imperial Japanese Navy	World War II: The Type C escort ship was torpedoed and sunk in the Pacific Ocean off Japan (39°36′N 142°05′E) by USS Sunfish (United States Navy).
Cap Guir	Germany	World War II: The cargo ship was torpedoed and sunk by a Soviet Douglas A-20 Havoc aircraft off Öland, Sweden with the loss of 756 lives.
USS Concrete No. 12	United States Navy	The 366-foot (112 m) B7-A1-class concrete-hulled oil barge was scuttled at position 'Baker North' at Iwo Jima as a breakwater for the Iwo Jima harbor project.
HMCS Esquimalt	Royal Canadian Navy	World War II: The Bangor-class minesweeper (592/690 t, 1942) was torpedoed and sunk in the Atlantic Ocean off Chebucto Head, Nova Scotia (at 44°28′N 63°10′W), by U-190 (Kriegsmarine) with the loss of 44 of her 71 crew. She was the last Canadian warship sunk during the war.
Gold Shell	United Kingdom	World War II: The tanker (8,208 GRT, 1931) was sunk in the North Sea by a Kriegsmarine Seehund midget submarine. Also reported as having struck a mine and sank at 51°21′09″N 2°53′30″E).
Goya	Kriegsmarine	World War II: Evacuation of East Prussia: The transport ship (5,230 GRT, 1942) was torpedoed and damaged in the Baltic Sea north of Hela Danzig-West Prussia by L-3 (Soviet Navy). She broke in two and sank the next day with the loss of between 6,220 and 7,028 lives. There were between 165 and 334 survivors.
Lützow	Kriegsmarine	Lutzow on the bottom in shallow water in the Kaiserfahrt on 26 April 1945 World War II: The Deutschland-class cruiser was bombed and sunk in shallow water in the Kaiserfahrt by Royal Air Force aircraft with her main deck above water, her anti-aircraft guns remaining in action until they ran out of ammunition on 4 May. She later was raised by the Soviet Union and sunk in weapons testing in July 1947.
Manryu Maru	Imperial Japanese Navy	World War II: The auxiliary transport was torpedoed and sunk in the Pacific Ocean off Japan (39°36′N 142°05′E) by USS Sunfish (United States Navy). 41 crewmen were killed.
Mercator	Germany	World War II: The cargo ship was bombed and damaged at Hela.
Monarch	United Kingdom	World War II: The cable ship (1,150 GRT, 1916) was torpedoed and sunk in the North Sea off Orfordness, Suffolk (52°06′04″N 1°50′19″E) by U-2324 (Kriegsmarine) with the loss of three of her 71 crew.
PiLB 554	Kriegsmarine	World War II: The PiLB 41 type landing craft was sunk in the Baltic Sea, either by mines or by shelled Soviet motor torpedo boats.
USS Pringle	United States Navy	World War II: The Fletcher-class destroyer was sunk in the Pacific Ocean off Okinawa, Japan by a kamikaze aircraft attack with the loss of 78 of her 336 crew.
R-15	Kriegsmarine	World War II: The Type R-2 minesweeper was sunk in the Adriatic Sea by Royal Navy motor torpedo boats.
StuBo-252	Kriegsmarine	World War II: The StuBo 39 type landing craft was sunk in the Baltic Sea, either by mines or shelled by Soviet motor torpedo boats.
Toko Maru	Japan	World War II: The cargo ship was torpedoed and sunk in the Pacific Ocean south of Honshu by USS Sea Dog (United States Navy).
Trombe	French Navy	The Bourrasque-class destroyer was hit and disabled in the Gulf of Genoa by MTM 26b ( Italian Republican Navy). The French destroyer was declared a constructive total loss.
U-78	Kriegsmarine	World War II: The Type VIIC submarine was shelled and sunk at Pillau, East Prussia by Red Army artillery.
U-880	Kriegsmarine	World War II: The Type IXC/40 submarine was depth charged and sunk in the Atlantic Ocean (47°18′N 30°26′W) by USS Frost and USS Stanton (both United States Navy) with the loss of all 49 crew.
U-1274	Kriegsmarine	World War II: The Type VIIC/41 submarine was depth charged and sunk in the North Sea north of Newcastle-upon-Tyne, Northumberland, United Kingdom (55°36′N 1°24′W) by HMS Viceroy (Royal Navy) with the loss of all 44 crew.

== 17 April ==
List of shipwrecks: 17 April 1945
Ship	State	Description
Boelke	Luftwaffe	World War II: The Karl Meyer-class seaplane tender was bombed and sunk off the Hel Peninsula by Soviet bombers.
HMS MTB 697	Royal Navy	World War II: The Fairmile D motor torpedo boat (90/107 t, 1943) was sunk by a mine in the Adriatic Sea.
Noshiro Maru No. 2 Go	Imperial Japanese Navy	The auxiliary minesweeper was lost on this date.
Sonjo Maru	Japan	World War II: The cargo ship was sunk by a mine in the Yangtze near where it empties into the East China Sea on "Middle Ground" off Shanghai, China (31°13′N 121°52′E). Five troops and eighteen crewmen were killed.
Tucuman	Germany	World War II: The cargo ship was bombed and sunk near Hamburg (54°21′N 10°20′E) in an Allied air raid.
V 1207 P. von Rensen	Kriegsmarine	World War II: The Vorpostenboot was sunk in the North Sea off Heligoland by Allied aircraft.

== 18 April ==
List of shipwrecks: 18 April 1945
Ship	State	Description
Cyrus H. McCormick	United States	World War II: Convoy HX 348: The Liberty ship was torpedoed and sunk in the Atlantic Ocean (48°05′N 6°28′W) by U-1107 (Kriegsmarine) with the loss of six of her 53 crew. Survivors were rescued by Gothland (United Kingdom).
Drache	Kriegsmarine	World War II: The artillery training ship was sunk at Fischhausen, Eastern Prussia by Soviet aircraft.
Empire Gold	United Kingdom	World War II: Convoy HX 348: The tanker (8,028 GRT, 1941) was torpedoed and sunk in the Atlantic Ocean (47°47′N 6°26′W) by U-1107 (Kriegsmarine) with the loss of 43 of her 47 crew. Survivors were rescued by Gothland (United Kingdom). Empire Gold was on a voyage from Philadelphia, Pennsylvania, United States to Antwerp, Belgium.
Filleigh	United Kingdom	World War II: Convoy TAM 118: The cargo ship (4,856 GRT, 1928) was torpedoed and sunk in the English Channel off Dover, Kent (51°19′30″N 1°42′00″E) by U-245 (Kriegsmarine) with the loss of five of her 54 crew.
I-56	Imperial Japanese Navy	World War II: The Type B1 submarine was sunk in the Pacific Ocean off Okinawa (26°42′N 130°38′E) by USS Collett, four other destroyers (all United States Navy) and United States Navy carrier-based aircraft.
Karmt	Norway	World War II: Convoy TAM 118: The cargo ship (4,991 GRT, 1938) was torpedoed and sunk in the English Channel off Dover (51°27′N 1°43′E) by U-245 (Kriegsmarine with the loss of four of her 39 crew. Survivors were rescued by HMT Sir Lancelot (Royal Navy).
Pollux	Germany	World War II: The cargo ship was bombed and sunk by aircraft at Hamburg, Germany. Raised 1945 and broken up in Wales in 1947.
SAT 5 Robert Müller 6	Kriegsmarine	World War II: The heavy gun carrier/landing fire support ship was bombed and sunk at Fischhausen by Soviet Douglas A-20 Havoc aircraft. 29 crew were killed.
Swiftscout	United States	World War II: The tanker was torpedoed and sunk in the Atlantic Ocean 145 nautical miles (269 km) north east of Cape Henry, North Carolina (37°30′N 73°03′W) by U-548, U-857 or U-879 (all Kriegsmarine) with the loss of one of her 47 crew. Survivors were rescued by Chancellorsville (United States).
Teizui Maru	Japan	World War II: The government chartered cargo liner was damaged by a mine at the west entrance of the Shimoneseki Strait off Yawata, Japan (34°05′N 130°50′E) and was beached in a small bay at Kamo-Shima, at the entrance to Yoshimi harbor, Yamaguchi Prefecture and abandoned.

== 19 April ==
List of shipwrecks: 19 April 1945
Ship	State	Description
Aquila	Kriegsmarine	World War II: The ex-Italian incomplete aircraft carrier was scuttled at Genoa. She was raised in 1946 and scrapped in 1952.
CHa-97	Imperial Japanese Navy	World War II: The CHa-1-class auxiliary submarine chaser was sunk in the Kii Channel (33°32′N 135°23′E) by USS Sennet (United States Navy).
Daisei Maru	Imperial Japanese Army	World War II: Convoy WA-201: The transport was torpedoed and sunk in the Pacific Ocean off Hokkaido (42°22′N 142°13′E) by USS Sunfish (United States Navy). 33 crewmen and two passengers were killed.
Dammtor	Germany	World War II: The cargo ship was bombed and sunk by aircraft in the Unterelbe.
Hagane Maru	Japan	World War II: The cargo ship was torpedoed and sunk in the Pacific Ocean south of Honshu by USS Sennet (United States Navy).
Isuzu Maru No. 3	Imperial Japanese Navy	World War II: The auxiliary guard boat was torpedoed and sunk in the Pacific Ocean south of Honshu by USS Cero (United States Navy). 23 crewmen were killed.
Kaiho Maru	Imperial Japanese Navy	World War II: Convoy WA-201: The government Ministry of Agriculture and Forestry owned, IJN requisitioned Kaiho Maru-class auxiliary gunboat, was torpedoed and sunk in the Pacific Ocean off Hokkaido (42°22′N 142°16′E) by USS Sunfish (United States Navy). Five crewmen were killed.
Kairyu Maru	Imperial Japanese Navy	World War II: The auxiliary gunboat was torpedoed and sunk in the Pacific Ocean south of Honshu by USS Silversides (United States Navy).
Kaiyo Maru	Japan	World War II: The coaster was torpedoed and sunk in the Yellow Sea by USS Trutta (United States Navy).
Kinshu Maru	Japan	World War II: The boat was sunk in the Yellow Sea by USS Trutta (United States Navy).
M-403	Kriegsmarine	World War II: The M-class minesweeper was bombed, strafed and sunk in the Kattegat, south-east of Anholt, Denmark by de Havilland Mosquito aircraft of 143, 235, 248 and 333 Squadrons, Royal Air Force.
Mitsuyama Maru	Japan	World War II: The boat was sunk in the Yellow Sea by USS Trutta (United States Navy).
Nygrunn	Norway	World War II: The coaster (65 GRT, 1943) either struck a mine, or was torpedoed and sunk in the Skaggerak off Egersund, Norway with the loss of seven crew.
USS Tolman	United States Navy	The Robert H. Smith-class destroyer ran aground on the Nagunna Reef, Japan. She was refloated on 25 April, repaired and returned to service.
U-251	Kriegsmarine	World War II: The Type VIIC submarine was sunk in the Kattegat (56°37′N 11°51′E) by a rocket attack by de Havilland Mosquito aircraft of 143, 235 and 248 Squadrons, Royal Air Force with the loss of 39 of her 43 crew.
U-548	Kriegsmarine	World War II: The Type IXC/40 submarine was depth charged and sunk in the Atlantic Ocean south east of Halifax, Nova Scotia, Canada (36°34′N 74°00′W) by USS Buckley and USS Reuben James (both United States Navy) with the loss of all 58 crew.
Westmark	Kriegsmarine	World War II: The minelayer was scuttled at La Spezia, Liguria, Italy.

== 20 April ==
List of shipwrecks: 20 April 1945
Ship	State	Description
Altengamme	Germany	World War II: The cargo ship was sunk in the Baltic Sea off Saßnitz, Mecklenburg-Vorpommern by Soviet aircraft.
Ana Divarica	Kingdom of Yugoslavia (Partizans)	World War II: The barge was sunk in the Sava River between Brcko and Sremska Mitrovica by a mine.
Ethel Crawford	United Kingdom	World War II: The trawler (200 GRT, 1919), a sold off Strath-class naval trawler, struck a mine laid by U-218 (Kriegsmarine) and sank in the Firth of Clyde (55°13′N 5°14′W) with the loss of all ten crew.
Kasja Miletic	Kingdom of Yugoslavia (Partizans)	World War II: The transport was sunk in the Sava River between Brcko and Sremska Mitrovica by a mine. She was carrying wounded, 203 died during the sinking and only 17 rescued.
Königsburg	Germany	World War II: The coaster was sunk in the Baltic Sea off Hela, Danzig-West Prussia by Soviet aircraft.
V 215	Kriegsmarine	World War II: The Vorpostenboot was sunk in the Baltic Sea off Hela by Soviet aircraft.

== 21 April ==
List of shipwrecks: 21 April 1945
Ship	State	Description
Ostmark	Kriegsmarine	World War II: The auxiliary minelayer was bombed and sunk by British aircraft west of Anholt, Denmark.
U-636	Kriegsmarine	World War II: The Type VIIC submarine was depth charged and sunk in the Atlantic Ocean west of Ireland (55°50′N 10°31′W) by HMS Bazely, HMS Bentinck and HMS Drury (all Royal Navy) with the loss of all 42 crew.

== 22 April ==
List of shipwrecks: 22 April 1945
Ship	State	Description
Aji Maru	Imperial Japanese Navy	World War II: The patrol boat was torpedoed and sunk in the Pacific Ocean south of Honshu (31°39′N 139°00′E) by USS Cero (United States Navy).
Ariake Maru	Imperial Japanese Navy	The auxiliary guard boat was lost on this date.
HMS LCA 841	Royal Navy	The landing craft assault (8.5/11.5 t, 1943) was sunk off Holland.
USS LCS-15	United States Navy	World War II: The landing craft support was sunk in the Pacific Ocean off Okinawa, Japan by a Japanese kamikaze attack. Survivors were rescued by USS Van Valkenburgh (United States Navy).
Neukuhren	Germany	World War II: The cargo ship was bombed and sunk by British aircraft off Fredrikshavn, Denmark (57°25′08″N 10°35′20″E. The wreck was partly salvaged post-war.
Onega	Soviet Union	World War II: Convoy PK 9: The cargo ship was torpedoed and sunk in the Barents Sea (69°40′N 33°18′E) by U-997 (Kriegsmarine) with the loss of five of her 42 crew. Survivors were rescued by BO-220 and BO-228 (both Soviet Navy).
Pavin Vinogradov	Soviet Union	World War II: The cargo ship was torpedoed and sunk in the Gulf of Alaska by I-180 (Imperial Japanese Navy).
USS SC-1019	United States Navy	The SC-497-class submarine chaser ran aground and sank in the Yucatan Channel (22°28′N 84°30′W) north west of Arroyos de Mantua, Cuba.
Sverre Helmersen	Norway	World War II: The Liberty ship (7,209 GRT, 1944) struck a mine and was damaged in the North Sea off Ramsgate, Kent, United Kingdom by U-2329 (Kriegsmarine). She was towed to Falmouth, Cornwall, where she was declared a total loss. Scrapped in 1948.
USS Swallow	United States Navy	World War II: The Auk-class minesweeper was sunk in the Pacific Ocean off the Ryukyu Islands, Japan (26°10′N 127°12′E) by a kamikaze aircraft attack.
U-518	Kriegsmarine	World War II: The Type IXC submarine was depth charged and sunk in the Atlantic Ocean north of the Azores, Portugal (43°26′N 38°23′W) by USS Carter and USS Neal A. Scott (both United States Navy) with the loss of all 56 crew.

== 23 April ==
List of shipwrecks: 23 April 1945
Ship	State	Description
USS PE-56	United States Navy	World War II: The Eagle-class patrol craft was torpedoed and sunk in the Atlantic Ocean 3 nautical miles (5.6 km) off Cape Elizabeth, Maine (near 43°33′N 70°10′W), by the submarine U-853 (Kriegsmarine) with the loss of 49 of her 62 crew. Survivors were rescued by the destroyer USS Selfridge (United States Navy). The wreck was located in 2019, at 43°30′00.31″N 070°05′58.16″W.
Ingerseks	Germany	World War II: The cargo ship (4,970 GRT, 1913), which had run agrount the previous day, was bombed and damaged in Risenfjord, Norway by Bristol Beaufighter aircraft of 144, 455 and 489 Squadrons, Royal Air Force. She was declared a total loss.
John Carver	United States	The Liberty ship was sunk by the explosion of her fuel tanks whilst under repair at Philadelphia, Pennsylvania. She was declared a constructive total loss, raised and scrapped.
Kruckau	Germany	World War II: The cargo ship was scuttled in the Elbe, Germany.
Riverton	United Kingdom	World War II: Convoy TBC 135: The cargo ship (7,345 GRT, 1943) was torpedoed and damaged in the Bristol Channel off St. Ives, Cornwall (50°25′N 5°25′W) by U-1023 (Kriegsmarine) with the loss of three of her 48 crew. She was beached in St Ives Bay. Later repaired and returned to service.
TR 106	Kriegsmarine	World War II: The RD-class minesweeper was scuttled at Genoa.
U-183	Kriegsmarine	World War II: The Type IXC/40 submarine was sunk by torpedo in the Java Sea (4°57′S 112°52′E) by USS Besugo (United States Navy) with the loss of 54 of her 55 crew.
UJ 2220 Lago Zuai	Kriegsmarine	World War II: The submarine chaser was scuttled on this date.
UJ 2222	Kriegsmarine	World War II: The submarine chaser, a former Gabbiano-class corvette, was sunk off Genoa by United States Navy PT Boats.
VAS 202	Kriegsmarine	World War II: The VAS 201-class submarine chaser was scuttled at La Spezia, Liguria, Italy.

== 24 April ==
List of shipwrecks: 24 April 1945
Ship	State	Description
Alpino	Germany	World War II: The Soldati-class destroyer was scuttled at Genoa, Italy.
Aoba	Imperial Japanese Navy	World War II: The Furutaka-class cruiser was bombed and heavily damaged, settling on the shallow bottom at Kure Naval Arsenal, by carrier aircraft of Task Force 38. Refloated and rerated as a floating anti-aircraft battery.
USS Frederick C. Davis	United States Navy	World War II: Operation Teardrop: The Edsall-class destroyer escort was torpedoed and sunk in the Atlantic Ocean (43°52′N 40°15′W) by U-546 (Kriegsmarine) with the loss of 115 of her 209 crew.
F 617	Kriegsmarine	The Type C2 Marinefährprahm was sunk on this date.
F 0770	Kriegsmarine	The MZ-B landing craft was sunk on this date.
F 819	Kriegsmarine	The Type DM minelaying Marinefährprahm was sunk on this date.
F 831	Kriegsmarine	The Type D Marinefährprahm was sunk on this date. Salvaged in 1946 and put in Italian service as MZ 831.
F 865	Kriegsmarine	The Type D Marinefährprahm was sunk on this date.
F 890	Kriegsmarine	The Type DM minelaying Marinefährprahm was sunk on this date.
F 2703	Kriegsmarine	The MZ-A landing craft was sunk on this date.
FR 24	Germany	World War II: The Guépard-class destroyer was scuttled at Genoa.
FR 32	Germany	World War II: The Bourrasque-class destroyer was scuttled at Genoa.
FR 37	Germany	World War II: The Le Hardi-class destroyer was scuttled at Genoa.
Ghibli	Germany	World War II: The Ciclone-class torpedo boat was scuttled at Genoa.
Huelva	Germany	World War II: The cargo ship was bombed and sunk by Soviet Douglas A-20 Havoc aircraft 8 nautical miles (15 km) west of Liepāja, Latvia.
Kronos	Germany	World War II: The cargo ship struck a mine and sank in the Vestfjord, Norway.
MAS 505, MAS 515 and MAS 558	Italian Social Republic Navy	World War II: The MAS boats were scuttled at Imperia, Liguria.
MAS 525, MAS 550 and MAS 554	Italian Social Republic Navy	World War II: The MAS boats were scuttled at Genoa.
MAS 556 and MAS 557	Italian Social Republic Navy	World War II: The MAS 552-class MAS boats were scuttled at Imperia.
MAS 561	Italian Social Republic Navy	World War II: The MAS boat was torpedoed and damaged off Imperia by USS PT-305 and USS PT-307 (both United States Navy). She was consequently scuttled.
Monmouth Coast	United Kingdom	World War II: The coaster (878 GRT, 1924) was torpedoed and sunk in the Atlantic Ocean 60 nautical miles (110 km) off Sligo, Ireland by U-1305 (Kriegsmarine) with the loss of sixteen of her seventeen crew.
MS 24	Italian Social Republic Navy	World War II: The torpedo boat was scuttled at La Spezia, Liguria.
MS 51	Italian Social Republic Navy	World War II: The torpedo boat was scuttled at Genoa.
Oldenburg	Kriegsmarine	World War II: The auxiliary minelayer, a converted Sesia-class water tanker (with landing capabilities), was scuttled at Genoa. Raised, repaired and returned to Italian service as a water tanker in 1946.
R 162, R 189, R 198 and R 199	Kriegsmarine	World War II: The minesweepers were scuttled at Genoa.
R-212	Kriegsmarine	World War II: The Type R-151 minesweeper was scuttled at Genoa.
RA 253, RA 254, RA 258, RA 262, RA 264, RA 265, RA 266, RA 267, and RA 268	Kriegsmarine	World War II: The minesweepers, former VAS 231-class submarine chasers, were scuttled at Genoa.
RD 101	Kriegsmarine	World War II: The RD-class minesweeper was scuttled at Genoa.
RD 106, RD 107, RD 108, RD 109 and RD 110	Germany	World War II: The incomplete minesweepers were scuttled at Genoa.
RD 102	Kriegsmarine	World War II: The incomplete RD-class minesweeper was scuttled at Genoa. Salvaged post war and put in Italian service as DV 111.
RD 103	Kriegsmarine	World War II: The incomplete RD-class minesweeper was scuttled at Genoa. Salvaged post war and put in Italian service as DV 112.
RD 104	Kriegsmarine	World War II: The incomplete RD-class minesweeper was scuttled at Genoa. Salvaged post war and put in Italian service as DV 114.
RD 105	Kriegsmarine	World War II: The incomplete RD-class minesweeper was scuttled at Genoa. Salvaged post war and put in Italian service as DV 115.
RD 106, RD 107, RD 108, RD 109, and RD 110	Germany	World War II: The incomplete RD-class minesweepers were scuttled at Genoa.
RD 111, RD 112 and RD 113	Kriegsmarine	World War II: The incomplete RD-class minesweepers were scuttled at Genoa.
S 509 and S 510	Kriegsmarine	World War II: The MAS boats were scuttled at La Spezia.
S 511	Kriegsmarine	World War II: The MAS 552-class MAS boat was scuttled at Imperia, Italy.
SA 1	Kriegsmarine	World War II: The MS 11-class MS boat was scuttled at Genoa.
SA 11	Kriegsmarine	World War II: The MAS 521-class MAS boat was scuttled at Imperia or Genoa, Italy.
SA 12 and SA 13	Kriegsmarine	World War II: The MAS 526-class MAS boats were scuttled at Imperia, Italy.
SA 14	Kriegsmarine	World War II: The MAS 552-class MAS boat was scuttled at Imperia, Italy.
SA 15	Kriegsmarine	World War II: The MAS 552-class MAS boat was scuttled off Liguria, Italy.
SA 16	Kriegsmarine	World War II: The MAS 552-class MAS boat was sunk off Imperia, Italy by USS PT-305 and USS PT-306 (both United States Navy).
SA 17	Kriegsmarine	World War II: The MAS 424-class MAS boat was scuttled at Alta Tirreno.
SA 18	Kriegsmarine	World War II: The MAS 423-class MAS boat was scuttled at Alta Tirreno.
SA 19	Italian Social Republic Navy or Kriegsmarine	World War II: The MAS 501-class MAS boat was scuttled at Genoa, Italy. Raised, repaired and returned to Italian service post war, ceded to the Soviet Union in 1948 as War Reparation.
SA 20	Kriegsmarine	World War II: The MAS 552-class MAS boat was scuttled at Monflacone, Italy.
SA 21	Kriegsmarine	World War II: The MAS 526-class MAS boat was scuttled at Monflacone, Italy.
SG 20	Germany	World War II: The corvette, a former Generali-class destroyer, was scuttled at Genoa.
TA31	Kriegsmarine	World War II: The torpedo boat, a former Freccia-class destroyer, was scuttled at Genoa.
TA32	Kriegsmarine	World War II: The torpedo boat, the former Yugoslav destroyer Dubrovnik, was scuttled at Genoa.
TA34	Germany	World War II: The Le Hardi-class destroyer was scuttled at Genoa. Raised in 1946 and returned to France. She was not repaired and scrapped in 1958.
Tübingen	Germany	World War II: The cargo ship was bombed and sunk in the Kattegat by de Havilland Mosquito aircraft of Coastal Command, Royal Air Force.
U-108	Kriegsmarine	End of World War II: The decommissioned Type IXB submarine was scuttled at Stettin, Pomerania.
U-546	Kriegsmarine	World War II: Operation Teardrop: The Type IXC/40 submarine was depth charged, hedgehogged and sunk in the Atlantic Ocean (43°53′N 40°07′W by USS Chatelain, USS Flaherty, USS Hayter, USS Hubbard, USS Janssen, USS Keith, USS Neunzer, USS Pillsbury and USS Varian (all United States Navy) with the loss of 26 of her 59 crew.
UIT-2	Kriegsmarine	World War II: The submarine was scuttled at Genoa.
UIT-3	Kriegsmarine	World War II: The submarine was scuttled at Genoa.
UJ 206	Kriegsmarine	World War II: The submarine chaser, a former Gabbiano-class corvette, was scuttled at Venice. Raised, repaired and put in Italian service as Bombarda in 1951.
UJ 2221, UJ 2222, UJ 2224, UJ 2227, and UJ 6083	Kriegsmarine	World War II: The submarine chasers, former Gabbiano-class corvettes, were scuttled at Genoa.
UJ 2225	Kriegsmarine	World War II: The incomplete Ape-class submarine chaser, a former Gabbiano-class corvette, was scuttled at Ansaldo Shipyard, Genoa.
UJ 2226	Kriegsmarine	World War II: The Ape-class submarine chaser, a former Gabbiano-class corvette, was scuttle at Monfalcone.
UJ 2228	Kriegsmarine	World War II: The incomplete Ape-class submarine chaser, a former Gabbiano-class corvette, was scuttled at CRDA Shipyard, Monfalcone.
UJ 6084	Kriegsmarine	World War II: The incomplete Ape-class submarine chaser, a former Gabbiano-class corvette, was scuttled at OTO Shipyard, Livorno.
UJ 6086	Kriegsmarine	World War II: The incomplete Ape-class submarine chaser, a former Gabbiano-class corvette, was scuttled at OTO Shipyard, Livorno.
VAS 238	Kriegsmarine	World War II: The VAS 231-class submarine chaser was scuttled at Genoa.
VAS 252, VAS 253 and VAS 263	Italian Social Republic Navy	World War II: The submarine chasers were scuttled at La Spezia.

== 25 April ==
List of shipwrecks: 25 April 1945
Ship	State	Description
BK-212	Soviet Navy	The Project 1125-class armored motor gunboat was sunk on this date.
BK-214	Soviet Navy	The Project 1125-class armored motor gunboat was sunk on this date.
F 709	Kriegsmarine	World War II: The Type MZ-A Marinefährprahm was sunk at La Spezia, Italy by an air raid.
F 846	Kriegsmarine	The Type D Marinefahrprahm was sunk on this date.
F 873	Kriegsmarine	World War II: The Type D Marinefahrprahm was sunk on this date, or on 9 May 1945 by Soviet aircraft.
F 969	Kriegsmarine	World War II: The Type D Marinefahrprahm was sunk incomplete at Monfalcone, Italy.
F 970	Kriegsmarine	World War II: The Type D Marinefahrprahm was sunk incomplete at Monfalcone, Italy.
F 1156	Kriegsmarine	The Type D Marinefahrprahm was sunk on this date.
G 202 Jadera	Kriegsmarine	The guard ship was lost on this date.
Graf Zeppelin	Kriegsmarine	World War II: The incomplete Graf Zeppelin-class aircraft carrier was scuttled at Stettin, West Pomerania. She was raised and salvaged by the Soviet Union in 1947.
Iglesias	Germany	World War II: The cargo ship was scuttled at Genoa, Italy. She was later raised and salvaged.
LAT 18 Heimatland	Kriegsmarine	The light gun carrier/landing fire support ship was sunk on this date.
R-162, R-198 and R-199	Kriegsmarine	World War II: The Type R-151 minesweepers were scuttled at Genoa.
RA 254, RA 258, RA 264, RA 260	Kriegsmarine	World War II: The VAS 301-class submarine chasers were scuttled at Genoa.
RD 147	Kriegsmarine	World War II: The incomplete RD-class minesweeper was scuttled at Costaguta shipyard, Genoa.
Ro-109	Imperial Japanese Navy	World War II: The Ro-100-class submarine was sunk in the Pacific Ocean 165 nautical miles (306 km) south southwest of Okino-Daito Jima (21°58′N 129°38′E) by USS Horace A. Bass (United States Navy).
SG 20	Kriegsmarine	World War II: The escort ship, a former Generali-class torpedo boat, was scuttled at Oneglia, Liguria, Italy as a blockship.
SG 23	Kriegsmarine	World War II: The escort ship was scuttled at Genoa.
TA32	Kriegsmarine	World War II: The radar picket destroyer/torpedo boat was scuttled at Genoa.
U-326	Kriegsmarine	World War II: The Type VIIC/41 submarine was sunk by torpedo in the Bay west of Brest, Finistère, France (48°12′N 5°42′W) by a Consolidated B-24 Liberator aircraft of the United States Navy with the loss of all 43 crew.
UJ 2231	Kriegsmarine	World War II: The submarine chaser, a former Élan-class corvette, was scuttled at Genoa.
VAS 252, VAS 253 and VAS 263	Italian Social Republic Navy	World War II: The VAS 301-class submarine chasers were scuttled at Genoa.
Vs 343	Kriegsmarine	World War II: The KSK-2-class naval drifter/Vorpostenboot was scuttled.
W-41	Imperial Japanese Navy	World War II: The W-19-class minesweeper was torpedoed and sunk in the East China Sea north of Keelung, Formosa (26°10′N 121°11′E) by USS Cod (United States Navy). There were 75 survivors, one was rescued by USS Cod as a prisoner of war.

== 26 April ==
List of shipwrecks: 26 April 1945
Ship	State	Description
BK-213	Soviet Navy	The Project 1125-class armored motor gunboat was sunk on this date.
F-248	Kriegsmarine	World War II: The Type A Marinefahrprahm was sunk in the Baltic Sea by Soviet aircraft.
Meshima Maru	Imperial Japanese Navy	The auxiliary minesweeper was lost on this date.
Slovenac	Yugoslavia (Partizans)	World War II: The tugboat, being used as a supply vessel, was sunk in the Sava River between Šabac and Sremska Mitrovica by a magnetic mine. Four crew were killed.
TK-802	Soviet Navy	The G-5-class motor torpedo boat was wrecked off Pillau.
Toyotu Maru	United States	The cargo ship (or a ship of the Toyotu Maru class), was scuttled at position 'Dog North' at Iwo Jima as a breakwater for the Iwo Jima harbor project.
Unknown landing craft	Kriegsmarine	World War II: Two PiLB 41 type landing craft were sunk in the Baltic Sea off Pillau by Soviet gunboats.
Ursa	Germany	World War II: The cargo ship was scuttled at Bremen. She was raised later in the year, repaired and entered Finnish service in 1947 as Margareta.
V1114	Kriegsmarine	World War II: The Vorpostenboot was bombed and sunk in the German Bight by aircraft of the Royal Air Force.
Wa-6	Imperial Japanese Navy	World War II: The No.1-class auxiliary minesweeper was shelled and sunk in the Sunda Sea (04°50′S 115°40′E) by HMS Sleuth and HMS Solent (both Royal Navy).

== 27 April ==
List of shipwrecks: 27 April 1945
Ship	State	Description
BK-8	Soviet Navy	The Project 1125-class armored motor gunboat was sunk on this date.
Canada Victory	United States	World War II: The Victory ship was sunk in the Pacific Ocean off Okinawa, Japan (26°23′N 127°41′E) by a Japanese kamikaze attack. Two gunners and a crewman were killed. Survivors swam to USS Lauderdale (United States Navy).
USS Concrete No. 7	United States Navy	The 366-foot (112 m), B7-A1-class concrete hulled oil barge was scuttled at position 'Easy West' at Iwo Jima as a breakwater for the Iwo Jima harbor project.
Kaiho Maru	Japan	World War II: The cargo ship struck a mine and sank in the Sea of Japan (34°00′N 130°50′E).
HMS Redmill	Royal Navy	World War II: The Captain-class frigate (1,432/1,823 t, 1943) was torpedoed and severely damaged in the Atlantic Ocean west of Ireland (54°32′N 10°36′W) by U-1105 (Kriegsmarine) with the loss of 32 of her 186 crew. She was towed to Lisahally, County Londonderry by HMS Rupert (Royal Navy) but was declared a constructive total loss.
Sperrbrecher 167	Kriegsmarine	World War II: The Sperrbrecher struck a mine and sank in the North Sea off Cuxhaven, Schleswig-Holstein (53°59.3′N 8°31.6′E), another source says damaged by the mine, and sank under tow on 2 May.
Yusen Maru No. 31 Go	Imperial Japanese Navy	The auxiliary submarine chaser was sunk on this date.

== 28 April ==
List of shipwrecks: 28 April 1945
Ship	State	Description
HMS BYMS 2053	Royal Navy	World War II: The BYMS-class minesweeper (207/320 t, 1943) struck a mine and sank off Porto Corsini, Ravenna, Italy.
CH-17	Imperial Japanese Navy	World War II: The No.13-class submarine chaser was torpedoed and sunk off Tomei Harbor, Fukue Shima, Goto Archipelago, (32°25′N 128°46′E) by USS Springer (United States Navy).
Dinorah	United Kingdom	The 110-foot (34 m), 192-ton trawler foundered off Bridlington, probably from a mine. Lost with all 10 or 11 hands.
Emily Sauber	Germany	World War II: The cargo ship was torpedoed and sunk in the Baltic Sea by TK-133 (Soviet Navy). She was refloated post-war, repaired and entered Polish service as Kielce.
Hashima	Imperial Japanese Navy	World War II: The Hashima-class cable layer was torpedoed and sunk off Kii Suido south south east of Mikizaki (33°55′N 136°18′E) by USS Sennet (United States Navy).
T-146	Imperial Japanese Navy	World War II: The No.101-class landing ship was torpedoed and sunk off Cape Ose, south of the Goto Islands, (32°24′N 128°00′E) by USS Trepang (United States Navy).
U-56	Kriegsmarine	World War II: The Type IIC submarine was sunk in a Royal Air Force air raid on Kiel, Schleswig-Holstein with the loss of six of her 25 crew.

== 29 April ==
List of shipwrecks: 29 April 1945
Ship	State	Description
Daishu Maru	Japan	World War II: The cargo ship, a converted Standard Type 2A tanker, (a.k.a. Taishu Maru), was sunk by torpedo in the Pacific Ocean east of Kamaishi, Honshu (39°12′N 142°20′E) by USS Cero (United States Navy). Her captain and 29 crewmen were killed.
F5	Kriegsmarine	World War II: The F-class escort ship struck a mine en route from Copenhagen, Denmark, to Swinemünde, Pomerania. Collided with a wreck while under tow and sank.
I-44	Imperial Japanese Navy	World War II: The Kaidai-class submarine was depth charged, torpedoed and sunk in the Pacific Ocean 220 nautical miles (410 km) south east of Okinawa (24°15′N 131°16′E) by a Grumman TBF Avenger from USS Tulagi (United States Navy).
Otome Maru	Imperial Japanese Navy	World War II: The guard ship was torpedoed and sunk by USS Besugo (United States Navy) north of Matashiri Island.
Petropolis	Germany	World War II: The cargo ship was bombed by aircraft at Hamburg, Germany. Beached at Juelsand in May 1945. Broken up in situ in 1946.
Quito	Kriegsmarine	World War II: The submarine tender/supply ship (a.k.a. Teiju Maru and Kito Go) was torpedoed and sunk in the Java Sea off Tanjung Puting Borneo (04°11′S 111°17′E) by USS Bream (United States Navy).
Ro-46	Imperial Japanese Navy	World War II: The Kaidai-class submarine was sunk in the Pacific Ocean 220 nautical miles (410 km) southeast of Okinawa (24°15′N 131°16′E) by aircraft from USS Tulagi (United States Navy). Lost with all 86 hands.
HMS Sheldrake	Royal Navy	World War II: The Kingfisher-class sloop was damaged/sunk in the North Sea by a Kriegsmarine Seehund midget submarine.
Takasago Maru	Japan	World War II: The tanker was torpedoed and sunk in the Gulf of Siam by HMS Tradewind (Royal Navy).
Teisho Maru	Imperial Japanese Navy	World War II: The auxiliary naval vessel was torpedoed and sunk in the Java Sea by USS Gabilan (United States Navy).
U-286	Kriegsmarine	World War II: The Type VIIC submarine was depth charged and sunk in the Barents Sea (69°29′N 33°37′E) by HMS Anguilla, HMS Cotton and HMS Loch Insh (all Royal Navy) with the loss of all 51 crew.
U-307	Kriegsmarine	World War II: The Type VIIC submarine was depth charged and sunk in the Barents Sea (69°24′N 33°44′E) by HMS Loch Insch (Royal Navy) with the loss of 37 of her 51 crew.
U-1017	Kriegsmarine	World War II: The Type VIIC/41 submarine was depth charged and sunk in the Atlantic Ocean north west of Ireland (56°04′N 11°06′W) by a Consolidated B-24 Liberator aircraft of 120 Squadron, Royal Air Force with the loss of all hands (34 known dead).

== 30 April ==
List of shipwrecks: 30 April 1945
Ship	State	Description
HMS Goodall	Royal Navy	World War II: Convoy RA 66: The Captain-class frigate (1,192/1,436 t, 1943) was scuttled by gunfire from the frigate HMS Anguilla (Royal Navy) in the Barents Sea. HMS Goodall had been torpedoed and severely damaged by U-286 (Kriegsmarine) with the loss of 112 of her 156 crew on 29 April 1945.
Kunikawa Maru	Imperial Japanese Navy	World War II: The transport ship was bombed and sunk in the Indian Ocean (1°15′S 116°50′E) by United States Army Air Force aircraft.
M 455	Kriegsmarine	World War II: The minesweeper was sunk in a British air raid on Cuxhaven, Schleswig-Holstein.
Miho Maru	Japan	World War II: Convoy MOSI-05: The cargo ship was torpedoed and sunk in the Yellow Sea by USS Trepang (United States Navy).
Nuwajima	Imperial Japanese Navy	World War II: The Hirashima-class minelayer (a.k.a. Nuwashima) was bombed and damaged by Boeing B-29 Superfortress aircraft of the 314th Bomb Group. Her stern was hit and blown off and she was beached on Onyu Shima (32°56′N 131°05′E). Fourteen crewmen were killed. Scrapped post-war.
RD 127	Kriegsmarine	World War II: The RD-class minesweeper was demolished by her crew at Monfalcone.
RD 128	Kriegsmarine	World War II: The incomplete RD-class minesweeper was demolished at Celli shipyard, Venice.
RD 129	Kriegsmarine	World War II: The incomplete RD-class minesweeper was demolished at Celli shipyard, Venice.
RD 130	Kriegsmarine	World War II: The incomplete RD-class minesweeper was demolished at Celli shipyard, Venice.
TA43	Kriegsmarine	World War II: The Beograd-class destroyer was sunk by Yugoslav artillery, or scuttled, at Trieste, Italy.
U-879	Kriegsmarine	World War II: The Type IXC/40 submarine was depth charged and sunk in the Atlantic Ocean east of Cape Hatteras, North Carolina, United States (36°34′N 74°00′W) by USS Bostwick, USS Coffman, USS Natchez, and USS Thomas (all United States Navy) with the loss of all 52 crew.
U-1107	Kriegsmarine	World War II: The Type VIIC/41 submarine was bombed and sunk in the Bay of Biscay west of Brest, Finistère, France (48°00′N 6°30′W) by a United States Navy Consolidated PBY Catalina aircraft of Squadron VP-63 with the loss of 37 crew.
U-3525	Kriegsmarine	World War II: The Type XXI submarine was bombed and damaged in the western Baltic Sea. She was consequently scuttled at Kiel, Schleswig-Holstein on 3 May.
Yuna Maru	Japan	World War II: The tanker struck a mine and sank in the Gulf of Siam off Linga, Malaya.
Yuno Maru	Imperial Japanese Army	World War II: The tanker struck a mine and sank in the Berhala Strait, Sumatra (00°58′S 104°31′E). A badly burned Japanese sailor, probably from Yuno Maru, was rescued by USS Besugo (United States Navy).

== Unknown date ==
List of shipwrecks: Unknown date 1945
Ship	State	Description
Adler	Kriegsmarine	World War II: The training ship was sunk by Allied bombers at Kiel.
CHa-199	Imperial Japanese Navy	World War II: The CHa-1-class auxiliary submarine chaser was sunk off Matsure Light, Japan by a mine sometime in April.
Chetvertyi Krabalov	United States	The cargo ship was scuttled at position 'Charlie North' at Iwo Jima as a breakwater for the Iwo Jima harbor project sometime between 8 April and 28 April.
Detlef	Germany	World War II: The cargo ship was sunk at Kiel during and Allied air raid. The wreck was raised in 1948 and scrapped.
F 170	Kriegsmarine	The Sperrbrecher, a converted Type A Marinefährprahm, was sunk sometime in April.
F 258AM	Kriegsmarine	The Type AM minelaying Marinefährprahm was sunk sometime in April.
F 266AM	Kriegsmarine	The Type AM minelaying Marinefährprahm was sunk sometime in April.
F 873	Kriegsmarine	World War II: The Type D Marinefahrprahm was sunk by Soviet Douglas A-20 Havoc aircraft on the Renoy River on 9 May, or on 25 April 1945 by Soviet aircraft.
Hanna Cords	Germany	World War II: The cargo ship was scuttled as a blockship at Stettin.
Hummel	Germany	The cargo ship was wrecked at Stettin, Pomerania. Wreck scuttled in 1947.
Kibitsu Maru	Imperial Japanese Army	World War II: The Kibitsu Maru-class depot ship sprang a major leak near Kobe and was beached to prevent sinking sometime in April. Refloated in April and was under repair from April–July before returning to service.
LAT 30 Prinses Beatrix	Kriegsmarine	World War II: The light gun carrier/landing fire support ship was sunk on 14 April, or sunk on 8 May by Soviet aircraft in the Baltic Sea.
HMS LCA 1346	Royal Navy	The landing craft assault reported lost in the Mediterranean Sea during April.
HMS LCM 1319 and HMS LCM 1327	Royal Navy	The landing craft mechanized were lost off the Arakan Coast, Burma sometime in April.
M 455	Kriegsmarine	World War II: The Type 1940 minesweeper was bombed and sunk sometime in April in an air raid. Raised and repaired post war.
Mario Ruta	Italian Social Republic	World War II: The cargo liner was scuttled at Trieste. Wreck scrapped in 1946.
HMS MGB 99	Royal Navy	The VTB-11-class motor gun boat was lost sometime in April.
Nymphe	Kriegsmarine	World War II: The Type 1915 minesweeper was scuttled sometime in April.
PiLB 43/II	Kriegsmarine	World War II: The PiLB 43 type landing craft was sunk by Soviet bombers sometime in April.
R-224	Kriegsmarine	World War II: The Type R-218 minesweeper was sunk at Swinemünde, Pomerania by Soviet aircraft sometime in April.
RD 135	Kriegsmarine	World War II: The incomplete RD-class minesweeper was scuttled at OTO shipyard, Leghorn in late April.
RD 136	Kriegsmarine	World War II: The incomplete RD-class minesweeper was scuttled at Picchiotti shipyard, Limite Sal Arno in late April.
RD 140	Kriegsmarine	World War II: The incomplete RD-class minesweeper was scuttled at Picchiotti shipyard, Limite Sal Arno in late April.
RD 147	Kriegsmarine	World War II: The incomplete RD-class minesweeper was scuttled at Castaguta shipyard, Genoa in late April.
RA 261	Kriegsmarine	World War II: The VAS 231-class submarine chaser was scuttled at La Spezia, Liguria, Italy sometime in April.
SA 2 and SA 3	Kriegsmarine	World War II: The MS 11-class MS boats were scuttled at La Spezia sometime in April.
SA 4	Kriegsmarine	World War II: The MS 51-class MS boat was scuttled at La Spezia sometime in April.
USS Snook	United States Navy	The Gato-class submarine was lost in the South China Sea between 8 and 20 April, cause unknown.
U-246	Kriegsmarine	World War II: The Type VIIC submarine was lost on patrol in the Irish Sea south of the Isle of Man with the loss of all 48 crew.
U-325	Kriegsmarine	World War II: The Type VIIC/41 submarine was lost on patrol on or after 7 April with the loss of all hands, apparently after striking a mine. Her wreck was discovered in the English Channel at 49°48′17″N 5°12′23″W in 2006.
U-396	Kriegsmarine	The Type VIIC submarine was lost on patrol after 11 April with the loss of all 45 crew due to a problem with her hydroplanes.
U-398	Kriegsmarine	World War II: The Type VIIC submarine was lost on patrol in the Atlantic Ocean or Arctic Sea on or after 17 April with the loss of all 43 crew.
U-548	Kriegsmarine	World War II: The Type IX submarine was depth charged and sunk in the Atlantic Ocean off Cape Henry, Virginia, United States (36°34′N 74°00′W) by USS Bostwick, USS Coffman, USS Natchez and USS Thomas (DE-102) (all United States Navy). Various dates are given by different sources; 19, 29 and 30 April.
U-857	Kriegsmarine	World War II: The Type IXC/40 submarine was lost on patrol in the Atlantic Ocean off the east coast of the United States after 14 April with the loss of all 59 crew. Cause unknown.
U-1055	Kriegsmarine	World War II: The Type VIIC submarine was lost on patrol in the Atlantic Ocean or English Channel after 23 April with the loss of all 49 crew. Cause unknown.
VAS 203 and VAS 225	Kriegsmarine	World War II: The VAS 201-class submarine chasers were scuttled at Alto Tirino, Abruzzo.
