= German submarine U-879 =

German World War II submarine

History

Nazi Germany
- Name: U-879
- Ordered: 2 April 1942
- Builder: DeSchiMAG AG Weser, Bremen
- Yard number: 1087
- Laid down: 26 June 1943
- Launched: 11 January 1944
- Commissioned: 19 April 1944
- Fate: Sunk on 30 April 1945

General characteristics
- Class & type: Type IXC/40 submarine
- Displacement: 1,144 t (1,126 long tons) surfaced; 1,257 t (1,237 long tons) submerged
- Length: 76.76 m (251 ft 10 in) o/a; 58.75 m (192 ft 9 in) pressure hull
- Beam: 6.86 m (22 ft 6 in) o/a; 4.44 m (14 ft 7 in) pressure hull
- Height: 9.60 m (31 ft 6 in)
- Draught: 4.67 m (15 ft 4 in)
- Installed power: 4,400 PS (3,200 kW; 4,300 bhp) (diesels); 1,000 PS (740 kW; 990 shp) (electric)
- Propulsion: 2 shafts; 2 × diesel engines; 2 × electric motors
- Speed: 19 knots (35 km/h; 22 mph) surfaced; 7.3 knots (13.5 km/h; 8.4 mph) submerged
- Range: 13,850 nmi (25,650 km; 15,940 mi) at 10 knots (19 km/h; 12 mph) surfaced; 63 nmi (117 km; 72 mi) at 4 knots (7.4 km/h; 4.6 mph) submerged
- Test depth: 230 m (750 ft)
- Complement: 4 officers, 44 enlisted
- Armament: 6 × torpedo tubes (4 bow, 2 stern); 22 × 53.3 cm (21 in) torpedoes; 1 × 3.7 cm (1.5 in) Flak M42 AA gun; 2 x twin 2 cm (0.79 in) C/30 AA guns

Service record
- Part of: 4th U-boat Flotilla; 19 April 1944 – 31 January 1945; 33rd U-boat Flotilla; 1 February – 30 April 1945
- Identification codes: M 00 832
- Commanders: Kptlt. Erwin Manchen; 19 April 1944 – 30 April 1945
- Operations: 1 patrol: 11 February – 30 April 1945
- Victories: 1 merchant ship damaged (8,537 GRT)

German submarine U-879 was a Type IXC/40 U-boat built for Nazi Germany's Kriegsmarine during World War II.

== Design ==
German Type IXC/40 submarines were slightly larger than the original Type IXCs. U-879 had a displacement of 1,144 tonnes (1,126 long tons) when at the surface and 1,257 tonnes (1,237 long tons) while submerged. The U-boat had a total length of 76.76 m (251 ft 10 in), a pressure hull length of 58.75 m (192 ft 9 in), a beam of 6.86 m (22 ft 6 in), a height of 9.60 m (31 ft 6 in), and a draught of 4.67 m (15 ft 4 in). The submarine was powered by two MAN M 9 V 40/46 supercharged four-stroke, nine-cylinder diesel engines producing a total of 4,400 metric horsepower (3,240 kW; 4,340 shp) for use while surfaced, two Siemens-Schuckert 2 GU 345/34 double-acting electric motors producing a total of 1,000 shaft horsepower (1,010 PS; 750 kW) for use while submerged. She had two shafts and two 1.92 m (6 ft) propellers. The boat was capable of operating at depths of up to 230 metres (750 ft).

The submarine had a maximum surface speed of 18.3 knots (33.9 km/h; 21.1 mph) and a maximum submerged speed of 7.3 knots (13.5 km/h; 8.4 mph). When submerged, the boat could operate for 63 nautical miles (117 km; 72 mi) at 4 knots (7.4 km/h; 4.6 mph); when surfaced, she could travel 13,850 nautical miles (25,650 km; 15,940 mi) at 10 knots (19 km/h; 12 mph). U-879 was fitted with six 53.3 cm (21 in) torpedo tubes (four fitted at the bow and two at the stern), 22 torpedoes, and a 3.7 cm (1.5 in) Flak M42 as well as two twin 2 cm (0.79 in) C/30 anti-aircraft guns. The boat had a complement of forty-eight.

== Service history ==
U-879 was ordered on 2 April 1942 from DeSchiMAG AG Weser in Bremen under the yard number 1087. Her keel was laid down on 26 June 1943 and the U-boat was launched the following year on 11 January 1944. She was commissioned into service under the command of Kapitänleutnant Erwin Manchen (Crew 36) in 4th U-boat Flotilla.

U-879 was transferred to 33rd U-boat Flotilla after completing training and working up for deployment. She left her base in Horten Naval Base on 9 February 1945 for operations off the US east coast. Since another U-boat, U-857 was operating at the same time in the vicinity, it is not clear, which ships were attacked U-879 or the other U-boat, which is missing. The US tanker Atlantic States was probably hit and damaged on 5 April 1945, while the Belgian steamer Belgian Airman and the US tanker Swiftscout may have been sunk by U-879 on 14 and 18 April respectively. The Norwegian tanker Katy might have been hit and damaged on 23 April.

Late on 29 April, a U-boat was picked up by escorts of convoy KN 382. USS Natchez tried to ram her but missed. Natchez with three more escorts, USS Coffman, USS Thomas, and USS Bostwick, chased the contact for several hours with depth charges and a hedgehog anti-submarine weapon. In the early hours of 30 April, a strong explosion was heard and the contact disappeared. Only in 1968 a wreck was discovered at 36°34′N 74°00′W, confirming the sinking of a U-boat. It is assumed that the U-boat in question was U-879, but there are indicators that it might have been U-857 instead.

== Summary of raiding history ==
Date	Ship Name	Nationality	Tonnage (GRT)	Fate
5 April 1945	Atlantic States	United States	8,537	Damaged

== Bibliography ==
- Busch, Rainer; Röll, Hans-Joachim (1999). German U-boat commanders of World War II: a biographical dictionary. Translated by Brooks, Geoffrey. London, Annapolis, Md: Greenhill Books, Naval Institute Press. ISBN 1-55750-186-6.
- Busch, Rainer; Röll, Hans-Joachim (1999). Der U-Boot-Krieg, 1939-1945: Deutsche U-Boot-Verluste von September 1939 bis Mai 1945 [German U-boat losses from September 1939 to May 1945] (in German). Vol. IV. Hamburg, Berlin, Bonn: Mittler. ISBN 3-8132-0514-2.
- Busch, Rainer; Röll, Hans-Joachim (2001). Der U-Boot-Krieg, 1939-1945: Deutsche U-Boot-Erfolge von September 1939 bis Mai 1945 [German U-boat successes from September 1939 to May 1945] (in German). Vol. III. Hamburg, Berlin, Bonn: Mittler. ISBN 3-8132-0513-4.
- Gröner, Eric; Jung, Dieter; Maass, Martin (1991). German Warships 1815-1945: U-boats and Mine Warfare Vessels. Vol. 2. Translated by Thomas, Keith; Magowan, Rachel. London: Conway Maritime Press. ISBN 0-85177-593-4.
