= German submarine U-1024 =

German World War II submarine

- U-995 Type VIIC/41 at the Laboe Naval Memorial. This U-boat is almost identical to U-1024.

History

Nazi Germany
- Name: U-1024
- Ordered: 13 June 1942
- Builder: Blohm & Voss AG, Hamburg
- Yard number: 224
- Laid down: 20 May 1943
- Launched: 3 May 1944
- Commissioned: 28 June 1944
- Fate: Captured on 12 April 1945 in the Irish Sea by RN frigates HMS Loch Glendhu and HMS Loch More at 53°39′N 05°03′W, but sunk the following day when being towed

General characteristics (VIIC/41)
- Class & type: Type VIIC/41 submarine
- Displacement: 759 tonnes (747 long tons) surfaced; 860 t (846 long tons) submerged
- Length: 67.23 m (220 ft 7 in) o/a; 50.50 m (165 ft 8 in) pressure hull
- Beam: 6.20 m (20 ft 4 in) o/a; 4.70 m (15 ft 5 in) pressure hull
- Height: 9.60 m (31 ft 6 in)
- Draught: 4.74 m (15 ft 7 in)
- Installed power: 2,800–3,200 PS (2,100–2,400 kW; 2,800–3,200 bhp) (diesels); 750 PS (550 kW; 740 shp) (electric)
- Propulsion: 2 shafts; 2 × diesel engines; 2 × electric motors
- Speed: 17.7 knots (32.8 km/h; 20.4 mph) surfaced; 7.6 knots (14.1 km/h; 8.7 mph) submerged
- Range: 8,500 nmi (15,700 km; 9,800 mi) at 10 knots (19 km/h; 12 mph) surfaced; 80 nmi (150 km; 92 mi) at 4 knots (7.4 km/h; 4.6 mph) submerged
- Test depth: 230 m (750 ft); Calculated crush depth: 250–295 m (820–968 ft)
- Complement: 44-52 officers & ratings
- Armament: 5 × 53.3 cm (21 in) torpedo tubes (4 bow, 1 stern); 14 × torpedoes; 1 × 8.8 cm (3.46 in) deck gun (220 rounds); 1 × 3.7 cm (1.5 in) Flak M42 AA gun; 2 × 2 cm (0.79 in) C/30 AA guns

Service record
- Part of: 31st U-boat Flotilla; 28 June 1944 – 31 January 1945; 11th U-boat Flotilla; 1 February – 12 April 1945
- Identification codes: M 39 246
- Commanders: Kptlt. Hans-Joachim Gutteck; 28 June 1944 – 12 April 1945
- Operations: 1 patrol: 3 March – 12 April 1945
- Victories: 1 merchant ship total loss (7,176 GRT); 1 merchant ship damaged (7,200 GRT)

German submarine U-1024 was a Type VIIC/41 U-boat built for Nazi Germany's Kriegsmarine for service during World War II. She was laid down on 20 May 1943 by Blohm & Voss, Hamburg as yard number 224, launched on 3 May 1944 and commissioned on 28 June 1944 under Kapitänleutnant Hans-Joachim Gutteck.

== Design ==
Like all Type VIIC/41 U-boats, U-1024 had a displacement of 759 tonnes (747 long tons) when at the surface and 860 tonnes (850 long tons) while submerged. She had a total length of 67.23 m (220 ft 7 in), a pressure hull length of 50.50 m (165 ft 8 in), a beam of 6.20 m (20 ft 4 in), and a draught of 4.74 m (15 ft 7 in). The submarine was powered by two Germaniawerft F46 supercharged six-cylinder four-stroke diesel engines producing a total of 2,800 to 3,200 metric horsepower (2,060 to 2,350 kW; 2,760 to 3,160 shp) and two BBC GG UB 720/8 double-acting electric motors producing a total of 750 metric horsepower (550 kW; 740 shp) for use while submerged. The boat was capable of operating at a depth of 250 metres (820 ft).

The submarine had a maximum surface speed of 17.7 knots (32.8 km/h; 20.4 mph) and a submerged speed of 7.6 knots (14.1 km/h; 8.7 mph). When submerged, the boat could operate for 80 nautical miles (150 km; 92 mi) at 4 knots (7.4 km/h; 4.6 mph); when surfaced, she could travel 8,500 nautical miles (15,700 km; 9,800 mi) at 10 knots (19 km/h; 12 mph). U-1024 was fitted with five 53.3 cm (21 in) torpedo tubes (four fitted at the bow and one at the stern), fourteen torpedoes or 26 TMA or TMB Naval mines, one 8.8 cm (3.46 in) SK C/35 naval gun, (220 rounds), one 3.7 cm (1.5 in) Flak M42 and two 2 cm (0.79 in) C/30 anti-aircraft guns. Its complement was between forty-four and sixty.

== Service history ==
The boat's service career began on 28 June 1944 with the 31st Training Flotilla, followed by active service with 11th Flotilla on 1 February 1945. U-1024 took part in no wolfpacks. U-1024 was captured on 12 April 1945 in the Irish Sea by British frigates HMS Loch Glendhu and HMS Loch More, at 53°39′N 05°03′W, with the loss of nine lives. There were 37 survivors. U-1024 sank the following day while being towed.

== Summary of raiding history ==
Date	Ship Name	Nationality	Tonnage (GRT)	Fate
7 April 1945	James W. Nesmith	United States	7,176	Total loss
12 April 1945	Will Rogers	United States	7,200	Damaged

== See also ==
- Battle of the Atlantic

== Bibliography ==
- Busch, Rainer; Röll, Hans-Joachim (1999). German U-boat commanders of World War II : a biographical dictionary. Translated by Brooks, Geoffrey. London, Annapolis, Md: Greenhill Books, Naval Institute Press. ISBN 1-55750-186-6.
- Gröner, Erich; Jung, Dieter; Maass, Martin (1991). German Warships 1815–1945, U-boats and Mine Warfare Vessels. Vol. 2. Translated by Thomas, Keith; Magowan, Rachel. London: Conway Maritime Press. ISBN 0-85177-593-4.
- Paul Kemp ( 1997) U-Boats Destroyed. Arms & Armour ISBN 1 85409 515 3
- Axel Niestle (1998) German U-Boat Losses during World War II. Greenhill Books ISBN 1 85367 352 8
