= SS Will Rogers =

Liberty ship of WWII

History

United States
- Name: Will Rogers
- Namesake: Will Rogers
- Owner: War Shipping Administration (WSA)
- Operator: Merchant & Miners Transportation, Co.
- Ordered: as type (EC2-S-C1) hull, MCE hull 923
- Awarded: 30 January 1942
- Builder: Bethlehem-Fairfield Shipyard, Baltimore, Maryland
- Cost: $1,061,559
- Yard number: 2073
- Way number: 15
- Laid down: 11 October 1942
- Launched: 8 November 1942
- Sponsored by: Betty Rogers
- Completed: 27 November 1942
- Identification: Call sign: KFDC
- Fate: Laid up in National Defense Reserve Fleet, Beaumont, Texas, 12 April 1948; Laid up in National Defense Reserve Fleet, Beaumont, Texas, 21 December 1949; Laid up in National Defense Reserve Fleet, Mobile, Alabama, 9 April 1952; Sold for scrapping, 12 March 1971, removed from fleet, 25 March 1961

General characteristics
- Class & type: Liberty ship; type EC2-S-C1, standard
- Tonnage: 10,865 LT DWT; 7,176 GRT
- Displacement: 3,380 long tons (3,434 t) (light); 14,245 long tons (14,474 t) (max)
- Length: 441 feet 6 inches (135 m) oa; 416 feet (127 m) pp; 427 feet (130 m) lwl
- Beam: 57 feet (17 m)
- Draft: 27 ft 9.25 in (8.4646 m)
- Installed power: 2 × Oil fired 450 °F (232 °C) boilers, operating at 220 psi (1,500 kPa); 2,500 hp (1,900 kW)
- Propulsion: 1 × triple-expansion steam engine, (manufactured by Ellicott Machine Corp., Baltimore, Maryland); 1 × screw propeller
- Speed: 11.5 knots (21.3 km/h; 13.2 mph)
- Capacity: 562,608 cubic feet (15,931 m^{3}) (grain); 499,573 cubic feet (14,146 m^{3}) (bale)
- Complement: 38–62 USMM; 21–40 USNAG
- Armament: Varied by ship; Bow-mounted 3-inch (76 mm)/50-caliber gun; Stern-mounted 4-inch (102 mm)/50-caliber gun; 2–8 × single 20-millimeter (0.79 in) Oerlikon anti-aircraft (AA) cannons and/or, 2–8 × 37-millimeter (1.46 in) M1 AA guns

SS Will Rogers was a Liberty ship built in the United States during World War II. She was named after Will Rogers, an American stage and film actor, vaudeville performer, cowboy, humorist, newspaper columnist, and social commentator from Oklahoma.

== Construction ==
Will Rogers was laid down on 11 October 1942, under a Maritime Commission (MARCOM) contract, MCE hull 923, by the Bethlehem-Fairfield Shipyard, Baltimore, Maryland; she was sponsored by Betty Rogers, the widow of Will Rogers, and was launched on 11 November 1942.

== History ==
She was allocated to Merchant & Miners Transportation, Co., on 27 November 1942.

On 12 April 1945, at 15:00, while steaming in Convoy BB-80, Will Rogers was torpedoed by U-1024, in the Irish Sea, at 53°48′N 4°46′W. She was struck on the starboard side in the #1 hold, which caused flooding in the hold and the forepeak. Will Rogers was then taken in tow and beached off of Holyhead, near SS James W. Nesmith, which had also been torpedoed by U-1024 on 7 April. The two ships were refloated on 23 April, and towed to Liverpool, for repairs. Will Rogers returned to service on 1 December 1945.

On 12 April 1948, she was first laid up in the National Defense Reserve Fleet, Beaumont, Texas. On 21 December 1949, she was returned to the National Defense Reserve Fleet, Beaumont, Texas. On 9 April 1952, she was laid up in National Defense Reserve Fleet, Mobile, Alabama. On 12 March 1971, she was sold for scrapping to Pinto Island Metals Co., for $41,400. She was removed from the fleet on 25 March 1971.

== Bibliography ==
- "Bethlehem-Fairfield, Baltimore MD". www.ShipbuildingHistory.com. 14 August 2008.
- Maritime Administration. "Will Rogers". Ship History Database Vessel Status Card. U.S. Department of Transportation, Maritime Administration.
- Davies, James (May 2004). "Specifications (As-Built)" (PDF). p. 23.
- "SS Will Rogers".
- "Will Rogers".
