= German submarine U-1107 =

German World War II submarine

History

Nazi Germany
- Name: U-1107
- Ordered: 2 April 1942
- Builder: Nordseewerke, Emden
- Yard number: 229
- Laid down: 20 August 1943
- Launched: 30 June 1944
- Commissioned: 8 August 1944
- Fate: Sunk on 30 April 1945

General characteristics
- Type: Type VIIC/41 submarine
- Displacement: 759 tonnes (747 long tons) surfaced; 860 long tons (874 t) submerged
- Length: 67.23 m (220 ft 7 in) o/a; 50.50 m (165 ft 8 in) pressure hull
- Beam: 6.20 m (20 ft 4 in) o/a; 4.70 m (15 ft 5 in) pressure hull
- Draught: 4.74 m (15 ft 7 in)
- Installed power: 2,800–3,200 PS (2,100–2,400 kW; 2,800–3,200 bhp) (diesels); 750 PS (550 kW; 740 shp) (electric)
- Propulsion: 2 shafts; 2 × diesel engines; 2 × electric motors
- Speed: 17.7 knots (32.8 km/h; 20.4 mph) surfaced; 7.6 knots (14.1 km/h; 8.7 mph) submerged
- Range: 8,500 nmi (15,700 km; 9,800 mi) at 10 knots (19 km/h; 12 mph) surfaced; 80 nmi (150 km; 92 mi) at 4 knots (7.4 km/h; 4.6 mph) submerged
- Test depth: 230 m (750 ft); Calculated crush depth: 250–295 m (820–968 ft)
- Complement: 44-52 officers & ratings
- Armament: 5 × 53.3 cm (21 in) torpedo tubes (4 bow, 1 stern); 14 × torpedoes; 1 × 8.8 cm (3.46 in) deck gun (220 rounds); 1 × 3.7 cm (1.5 in) Flak M42 AA gun; 2 × 2 cm (0.79 in) C/30 AA guns

Service record
- Part of: 8th U-boat Flotilla; 8 August 1944 – 15 February 1945; 11th U-boat Flotilla; 16 February – 30 April 1945
- Identification codes: M 26 199
- Commanders: Oblt.z.S. / Kptlt. Fritz Parduhn; 8 August 1944 – 30 April 1945
- Operations: 1 patrol: 29 March – 30 April 1945
- Victories: 2 merchant ships sunk (15,209 GRT)

German submarine U-1107 was a Type VIIC/41 U-boat built for Nazi Germany's Kriegsmarine for service during World War II. She was laid down on 20 August 1943 by Nordseewerke, Emden as yard number 229, launched on 30 June 1944 and commissioned on 8 August 1944 under Oberleutnant zur See Fritz Parduhn.

== Design ==
Like all Type VIIC/41 U-boats, U-1107 had a displacement of 759 tonnes (747 long tons) when at the surface and 860 tonnes (850 long tons) while submerged. She had a total length of 67.23 m (220 ft 7 in), a pressure hull length of 50.50 m (165 ft 8 in), a beam of 6.20 m (20 ft 4 in), and a draught of 4.74 m (15 ft 7 in). The submarine was powered by two Germaniawerft F46 supercharged six-cylinder four-stroke diesel engines producing a total of 2,800 to 3,200 metric horsepower (2,060 to 2,350 kW; 2,760 to 3,160 shp) and two SSW GU 343/38-8 double-acting electric motors producing a total of 750 metric horsepower (550 kW; 740 shp) for use while submerged. The boat was capable of operating at a depth of 250 metres (820 ft).

The submarine had a maximum surface speed of 17.7 knots (32.8 km/h; 20.4 mph) and a submerged speed of 7.6 knots (14.1 km/h; 8.7 mph). When submerged, the boat could operate for 80 nautical miles (150 km; 92 mi) at 4 knots (7.4 km/h; 4.6 mph); when surfaced, she could travel 8,500 nautical miles (15,700 km; 9,800 mi) at 10 knots (19 km/h; 12 mph). U-1107 was fitted with five 53.3 cm (21 in) torpedo tubes (four fitted at the bow and one at the stern), fourteen torpedoes or 26 TMA or TMB Naval mines, one 8.8 cm (3.46 in) SK C/35 naval gun, (220 rounds), one 3.7 cm (1.5 in) Flak M42 and two 2 cm (0.79 in) C/30 anti-aircraft guns. Its complement was between forty-four and sixty.

== Service history ==
The boat's career began with training at 8th U-boat Flotilla on 8 August 1944, followed by active service on 16 February 1945 as part of the 11th Flotilla for the remainder of her service. In one patrol she sank two merchant ships, for a total of 15,209 gross register tons (GRT).

=== Fate ===
Sources agree that U-1107 was sunk on 30 April 1945 in the Bay of Biscay west of Brest, but differ as to the exact location of the sinking and the immediate cause: according to one source, U-1107 was sunk at position 48°12′N 05°42′W by a homing torpedo from a US Navy Liberator of VP-103 with all hands lost, whereas another source reports U-1107 being sunk at position 48°00′N 06°30′W by one or more out of 24 bombs dropped by USN Catalina 'R' of VPB-63, flown by Lt. F.G. Lake, on a MAD Rover patrol with 37 submarine crew killed and an unknown number surviving.

== Summary of raiding history ==
| Date | Ship Name | Nationality | Tonnage (GRT) | Fate |
|---|---|---|---|---|
| 18 April 1945 | Cyrus H. McCormick | United States | 7,181 | Sunk |
| 18 April 1945 | Empire Gold | United Kingdom | 8,028 | Sunk |

== See also ==
- Battle of the Atlantic

== Bibliography ==
- Busch, Rainer; Röll, Hans-Joachim (1999). German U-boat commanders of World War II : a biographical dictionary. Translated by Brooks, Geoffrey. London, Annapolis, Md: Greenhill Books, Naval Institute Press. ISBN 1-55750-186-6.
- Busch, Rainer; Röll, Hans-Joachim (1999). Deutsche U-Boot-Verluste von September 1939 bis Mai 1945 [German U-boat losses from September 1939 to May 1945]. Der U-Boot-Krieg (in German). Vol. IV. Hamburg; Berlin; Bonn: Mittler. ISBN 3-8132-0514-2.
- Gröner, Erich; Jung, Dieter; Maass, Martin (1991). German Warships 1815–1945, U-boats and Mine Warfare Vessels. Vol. 2. Translated by Thomas, Keith; Magowan, Rachel. London: Conway Maritime Press. ISBN 0-85177-593-4.
- Kemp, Paul (1997). U-Boats Destroyed - German submarine losses in the World Wars. Arms and Armour Press. ISBN 1-85409-321-5.
- Sharpe, Peter (1998). U-Boat Fact File. Great Britain: Midland Publishing. ISBN 1-85780-072-9.
