= German submarine U-2321 =

German World War II submarine

- Rendering of a Type XXIII submarine

History

Nazi Germany
- Name: U-2321
- Ordered: 20 September 1943
- Builder: Deutsche Werft, Hamburg
- Yard number: 475
- Laid down: 10 March 1944
- Launched: 17 April 1944
- Commissioned: 12 June 1944
- Fate: Surrendered on 9 May 1945; Sunk as target on 27 November 1945 during Operation Deadlight

General characteristics
- Class & type: Type XXIII submarine
- Displacement: 234 t (230 long tons) surfaced; 258 t (254 long tons) submerged
- Length: 34.68 m (113 ft 9 in)
- Beam: 3.02 m (9 ft 11 in)
- Draft: 3.66 m (12 ft)
- Propulsion: 1 × MWM RS134S 6-cylinder diesel engine, 575–630 metric horsepower (423–463 kW; 567–621 shp); 1 × AEG GU4463-8 double-acting electric motor, 580 metric horsepower (427 kW; 572 shp); 1 × BBC CCR188 electric creeping motor, 35 metric horsepower (26 kW; 35 shp)
- Speed: 9.7 knots (18 km/h; 11 mph) surfaced; 12.5 knots (23 km/h; 14 mph) submerged
- Range: 2,600 nmi (4,800 km; 3,000 mi) at 8 knots (15 km/h; 9.2 mph) surfaced; 194 nmi (359 km; 223 mi) at 4 knots (7.4 km/h; 4.6 mph) submerged
- Test depth: 180 m (590 ft)
- Complement: 14–18
- Armament: 2 bow torpedo tubes; 2 torpedoes

Service record
- Part of: 4th U-boat Flotilla; 12 June – 14 August 1944; 32nd U-boat Flotilla; 15 August 1944 – 31 January 1945; 11th U-boat Flotilla; 1 February – 8 May 1945
- Identification codes: M 41 224
- Commanders: Oblt.z.S. Hans-Heinrich Barschkis; 12 June 1944 – 9 May 1945
- Operations: 1 patrol: 9 March – 13 April 1945
- Victories: 1 merchant ship sunk (1,406 GRT)

German submarine U-2321 was the first of the highly advanced Type XXIII U-boats built for Nazi Germany's Kriegsmarine in 1944 and 1945. As the first of this class, U-2321 was one of a handful of such boats to undertake an operational patrol, in March 1945. She was successful in this operation, and sank a British freighter, one of just five ships sunk by the new fully submarine (as opposed to just submersible) boats.

She was constructed as an experiment in Hamburg and her small size meant that she was completed in just four months, following which she conducted extensive trials in the Baltic Sea and off the Norwegian coast in an effort to gain an idea of the capabilities of the boat. In this duty, and through her entire life, U-2321 was commanded by Oberleutnant zur See Hans-Heinrich Barschkis. By the first few months of 1945, with the war drawing to a close, it was hoped new lessons could be learnt, and defeat potentially delayed by the insertion of some of these boats into the coastal waters of the United Kingdom. To this end, U-2321 and a few of her sisters were dispatched to the Eastern coast of Scotland.

== Design ==
Like all Type XXIII U-boats, U-2321 had a displacement of 234 tonnes (230 long tons) when at the surface and 258 tonnes (254 long tons) while submerged. She had a total length of 34.68 m (113 ft 9 in) (o/a), a beam width of 3.02 m (9 ft 11 in) (o/a), and a draught depth of 3.66 m (12 ft). The submarine was powered by one MWM six-cylinder RS134S diesel engine providing 575–630 metric horsepower (423–463 kilowatts; 567–621 shaft horsepower), one AEG GU4463-8 double-acting electric motor electric motor providing 580 PS (430 kW; 570 shp), and one BBC silent running CCR188 electric motor providing 35 PS (26 kW; 35 shp).

The submarine had a maximum surface speed of 9.7 knots (18.0 km/h; 11.2 mph) and a submerged speed of 12.5 knots (23.2 km/h; 14.4 mph). When submerged, the boat could operate at 4 knots (7.4 km/h; 4.6 mph) for 194 nautical miles (359 km; 223 mi); when surfaced, she could travel 2,600 nautical miles (4,800 km; 3,000 mi) at 8 knots (15 km/h; 9.2 mph). U-2321 was fitted with two 53.3 cm (21 in) torpedo tubes in the bow. She could carry two preloaded torpedoes. The complement was 14–18 men. This class of U-boat did not carry a deck gun.

== Service history ==
The boats were unsuccessful, largely because of the professional nature of veteran Allied naval commanders in their construction of convoys and their preparation of escorts. The North Sea proved largely barren, as most shipping was concentrated in the heavily defended English Channel, as so it was nearly a month after leaving Horten Naval Base in Norway that U-2321 scored her first and only victory, torpedoing the unescorted 1,406 GRT steamship Gasray.

Four days later, U-2321 was back in port at Kristiansand, where she was still berthed when Germany surrendered on 9 May. Sailed to Loch Ryan in Scotland, U-2321 was allowed to rust and rot, the decaying hull destroyed as a naval gunfire target on 27 November 1945 along with all the other surrendered Norwegian U-boats.

== Summary of raiding history ==
Date	Ship Name	Nationality	Tonnage (GRT)	Fate
5 April 1945	Gasray	United Kingdom	1,406	Sunk

== Bibliography ==
- Busch, Rainer; Röll, Hans-Joachim (1999). German U-boat commanders of World War II : a biographical dictionary. Translated by Brooks, Geoffrey. London, Annapolis, Md: Greenhill Books, Naval Institute Press. ISBN 1-55750-186-6.
- Busch, Rainer; Röll, Hans-Joachim (1999). Deutsche U-Boot-Verluste von September 1939 bis Mai 1945 [German U-boat losses from September 1939 to May 1945]. Der U-Boot-Krieg (in German). Vol. IV. Hamburg, Berlin, Bonn: Mittler. ISBN 3-8132-0514-2.
- Gröner, Erich; Jung, Dieter; Maass, Martin (1991). U-boats and Mine Warfare Vessels. German Warships 1815–1945. Vol. 2. Translated by Thomas, Keith; Magowan, Rachel. London: Conway Maritime Press. ISBN 0-85177-593-4.
- Sharpe, Peter (1998). U-Boat Fact File. Great Britain: Midland Publishing. ISBN 1-85780-072-9.
