= MV Belgian Airman =

Belgian cargo ship (1941–1945)

History
- Name: Empire Ballantyne (1941-42); Belgian Airman (1942-45)
- Owner: Ministry of War Transport (1941-42); Belgian Government (1942-45)
- Operator: Compagnie Maritime Belge, Antwerp (1942-45)
- Port of registry: (United Kingdom) Glasgow (1941-42); (Belgium) Antwerp (1942-45)
- Builder: Harland & Wolff Ltd, Glasgow
- Yard number: 1093
- Launched: 21 October 1941
- Completed: February 1942
- Identification: UK Official number 168706 (1941-42); Code Letters BCQH allocated (1941-42)
- Fate: Sunk, 14 April 1945

General characteristics
- Tonnage: 6,959 GRT
- Length: 432 ft 2 in (131.72 m)
- Beam: 56 ft 2 in (17.12 m)
- Depth: 34 ft 3 in (10.44 m)
- Propulsion: 2 x 6-cylinder SCSA diesel engines (Harland & Wolff Ltd, Glasgow) 490 hp (370 kW)
- Complement: 41, plus 6 DEMS gunners.

Location of the sinking of Belgian Airman.

Belgian Airman was a 6,959-ton cargo ship which was built by Harland & Wolff Ltd, Glasgow in 1941 for the Ministry of War Transport (MoWT). She was launched as Empire Ballantyne and transferred to the Belgian Government in 1942. She was sunk by a German U-boat on 14 April 1945.

== History ==
Empire Ballantyne was built by Harland & Wolff Ltd, Glasgow as yard number 1093. She was launched on 21 October 1941 and completed in February 1942. She was built for the MoWT and was to have been operated under the management of W A Souter & Co Ltd, Newcastle upon Tyne. On 15 February 1942 she was transferred to the Régie de la Marine of the Belgian Government and renamed Belgian Airman. She was managed by Compagnie Maritime Belge, Antwerp.

On 25 April 1942, Belgian Airman rescued 23 survivors from the 3,841 GRT SS Modesta, which had been torpedoed and sunk by U-108 at 33°40′N 63°10′W. The survivors were landed in Bermuda.

Belgian Airman was a member of a number of convoys during the Second World War.

ON 162

Convoy ON 162 sailed from Liverpool on 12 January 1943 and arrived at New York on 11 February. Belgian Airman was carrying the Commodore, Captain H.C. Birnie, RNR.

HX 228

Convoy HX 228 sailed from New York on 28 February 1943 and arrived at Liverpool on 15 March. Belgian Airman was one of the ships that detached from the convoy and proceeded to Halifax, Nova Scotia in order to reduce the size of the convoy to 60 ships.

HX 229A

Convoy HX 229A which from New York on 9 March 1943 and arrived at Liverpool on 26 March. Belgian Airman joined at Halifax on 12 March. During the voyage, Belgian Airman was damaged by ice and diverted to Reykjavík, Iceland. She was carrying a cargo of steel and timber.

SL 136

Convoy SL 136 sailed from Freetown, Sierra Leone on 3 September 1943 and arrived at Liverpool on 23 September. Belgian Airman was destined for Loch Ewe.

== Sinking ==
On 8 April 1945, Belgian Airman departed Houston, bound for New York and Antwerp. She was carrying a cargo of sorghum and dairy feed. At 15:50 CET, on 14 April 1945, Belgian Airman was torpedoed and sunk off Chesapeake Bay, Maryland (36°09′N 75°05′W). Her attacker was U-857. One crew member was killed. The 46 survivors were rescued by the Liberty ship SS Harold A. Jordan. The survivors were landed at New York.

The fate of the U-857 is unknown. It disappeared in the Atlantic in April, 1945. One theory is that it was sunk by a US Navy Airship with a Mk 24 FIDO Air-Dropped ASW Homing Torpedo.

== Official number and code letters ==
Official Numbers were a forerunner to IMO Numbers.

Empire Ballantyne had the UK Official Number 168706 and the Code Letters BCHQ were allocated to her.
