= German submarine U-857 =

German World War II submarine

History

Nazi Germany
- Name: U-857
- Ordered: 5 June 1941
- Builder: DeSchiMAG AG Weser, Bremen
- Yard number: 1063
- Laid down: 16 November 1942
- Launched: 25 May 1943
- Commissioned: 16 September 1943
- Fate: Missing since 30 April 1945 in the North Atlantic off the U.S. East Coast

General characteristics
- Class & type: Type IXC/40 submarine
- Displacement: 1,144 t (1,126 long tons) surfaced; 1,257 t (1,237 long tons) submerged
- Length: 76.76 m (251 ft 10 in) o/a; 58.75 m (192 ft 9 in) pressure hull
- Beam: 6.86 m (22 ft 6 in) o/a; 4.44 m (14 ft 7 in) pressure hull
- Height: 9.60 m (31 ft 6 in)
- Draught: 4.67 m (15 ft 4 in)
- Installed power: 4,400 PS (3,200 kW; 4,300 bhp) (diesels); 1,000 PS (740 kW; 990 shp) (electric)
- Propulsion: 2 shafts; 2 × diesel engines; 2 × electric motors
- Speed: 18.3 knots (33.9 km/h; 21.1 mph) surfaced; 7.3 knots (13.5 km/h; 8.4 mph) submerged
- Range: 13,850 nmi (25,650 km; 15,940 mi) at 10 knots (19 km/h; 12 mph) surfaced; 63 nmi (117 km; 72 mi) at 4 knots (7.4 km/h; 4.6 mph) submerged
- Test depth: 230 m (750 ft)
- Complement: 4 officers, 44 enlisted
- Armament: 6 × torpedo tubes (4 bow, 2 stern); 22 × 53.3 cm (21 in) torpedoes; 1 × 3.7 cm (1.5 in) Flak M42 AA gun; 2 x twin 2 cm (0.79 in) C/30 AA guns

Service record
- Part of: 4th U-boat Flotilla; 16 September 1943 – 31 May 1944; 10th U-boat Flotilla; 1 June – 30 September 1944; 33rd U-boat Flotilla; 1 October 1944 – 30 April 1945
- Identification codes: M 52 607
- Commanders: Kptlt. Rudolf Premauer; 16 September 1943 – 30 April 1945
- Operations: 3 patrols: 1st patrol: 9 May – 13 August 1944; 2nd patrol: a. 25 August – 11 October 1944; b. 17 – 19 October 1944; c. 1 December 1944; d. 30 January – 2 February 1945; 3rd patrol: 6 February – 30 April 1945
- Victories: 2 merchant ships sunk (15,259 GRT); 1 merchant ship damaged (6,825 GRT)

German submarine U-857 was a Type IXC/40 U-boat of Nazi Germany's Kriegsmarine built for service during the Second World War. She was ordered on 5 June 1941, laid down on 16 November 1942, and launched on 25 May 1943. For her operational lifespan, she was commanded by Kapitänleutnant Rudolf Premauer and had a complement of 59.

== Design ==
German Type IXC/40 submarines were slightly larger than the original Type IXCs. U-857 had a displacement of 1,144 tonnes (1,126 long tons) when at the surface and 1,257 tonnes (1,237 long tons) while submerged. The U-boat had a total length of 76.76 m (251 ft 10 in), a pressure hull length of 58.75 m (192 ft 9 in), a beam of 6.86 m (22 ft 6 in), a height of 9.60 m (31 ft 6 in), and a draught of 4.67 m (15 ft 4 in). The submarine was powered by two MAN M 9 V 40/46 supercharged four-stroke, nine-cylinder diesel engines producing a total of 4,400 metric horsepower (3,240 kW; 4,340 shp) for use while surfaced, two Siemens-Schuckert 2 GU 345/34 double-acting electric motors producing a total of 1,000 shaft horsepower (1,010 PS; 750 kW) for use while submerged. She had two shafts and two 1.92 m (6 ft) propellers. The boat was capable of operating at depths of up to 230 metres (750 ft).

The submarine had a maximum surface speed of 18.3 knots (33.9 km/h; 21.1 mph) and a maximum submerged speed of 7.3 knots (13.5 km/h; 8.4 mph). When submerged, the boat could operate for 63 nautical miles (117 km; 72 mi) at 4 knots (7.4 km/h; 4.6 mph); when surfaced, she could travel 13,850 nautical miles (25,650 km; 15,940 mi) at 10 knots (19 km/h; 12 mph). U-857 was fitted with six 53.3 cm (21 in) torpedo tubes (four fitted at the bow and two at the stern), 22 torpedoes, and a 3.7 cm (1.5 in) Flak M42 as well as two twin 2 cm (0.79 in) C/30 anti-aircraft guns. The boat had a complement of forty-eight.

== Service history ==
She undertook three patrols, the first was for training. She sank two ships for a total tonnage of 15,259 gross register tons (GRT), and damaged one other ship on her last two patrols. She sank Belgian Airman on 14 April 1945, Swiftscout on 18 April 1945 and damaged Katy on 23 April 1945.

=== Fate ===
U-857 went missing since 30 April 1945 in the North Atlantic Ocean off the east coast of the United States. All hands were lost, and no wreckage was found.

The U-boat had been claimed to have been sunk by depth charge hedgehogs off the coast of Massachusetts on 7 April 1945 by USS Gustafson, or may have been sunk by USS Coffman. More recent commentary alleges Gustafson had not hit her, and her loss is currently unexplained. U-857 was considered as a possible identity for the wreck ultimately determined to be U-869.

== Summary of raiding history ==
Date	Ship Name	Nationality	Tonnage (GRT)	Fate
14 April 1945	Belgian Airman	Belgium	6,959	Sunk
18 April 1945	Swiftscout	United States	8,300	Sunk
23 April 1945	Katy	Norway	6,825	Damaged

== Bibliography ==
- Busch, Rainer; Röll, Hans-Joachim (1999). German U-boat commanders of World War II : a biographical dictionary. Translated by Brooks, Geoffrey. London, Annapolis, Md: Greenhill Books, Naval Institute Press. ISBN 1-55750-186-6.
- Busch, Rainer; Röll, Hans-Joachim (1999). Der U-Boot-Krieg, 1939-1945: Deutsche U-Boot-Verluste von September 1939 bis Mai 1945 [German U-boat losses from September 1939 to May 1945] (in German). Vol. IV. Hamburg, Berlin, Bonn: Mittler. ISBN 3-8132-0514-2.
- Gröner, Eric; Jung, Dieter; Maass, Martin (1991). German Warships 1815-1945: U-boats and Mine Warfare Vessels. Vol. 2. Translated by Thomas, Keith; Magowan, Rachel. London: Conway Maritime Press. ISBN 0-85177-593-4.
