= Japanese escort ship Aguni =

Imperial Japanese warship (1944–1945)

History

Japan
- Name: Aguni
- Builder: Nihon Kokan, Tsurumi
- Launched: 21 September 1944
- Stricken: 30 November 1945
- Fate: Scrapped at Iino Kaiun K. K on 20 May 1948

General characteristics
- Displacement: 940 tons
- Length: 78,8 meters
- Beam: 9 meters
- Draught: 3 meters
- Propulsion: diesels, 4200 bhp
- Speed: 19,5 knots
- Complement: 150
- Armament: 3 x 120 mm (4.7 in)/45; 6 x 25mm Type 96 AA guns; Depth charges

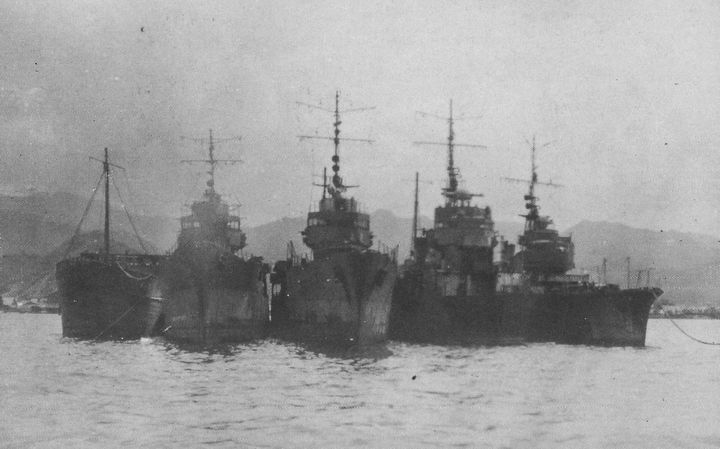
Japanese defense ships in Maizuru. From the right: Hachijo, Aguni, Kuga, and Coastal Defense Ship No. 200, 1947

Aguni was an Ukuru-class escort ship of the Imperial Japanese Navy during the Second World War and was named after the Aguni Islands. She was launched on 21 September 1944. The ship was heavily damaged by a U.S. Bat radar-guided glide bomb on 27 May 1945 although the damage is often miscredited as from a mine. The ship was scrapped on 20 May 1948.
