= USS LST-570 =

United States Navy LST-542-class tank landing ship

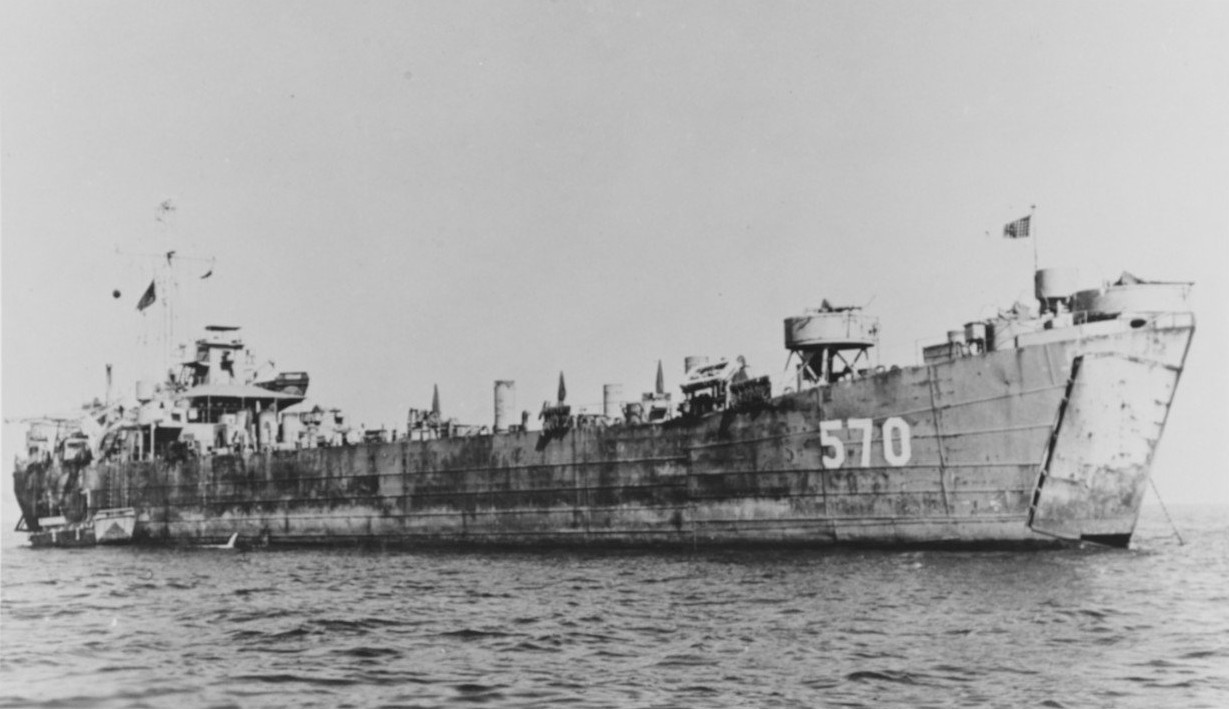

History

United States
- Name: LST-570
- Builder: Missouri Valley Bridge and Iron Company, Evansville, Indiana
- Laid down: 14 April 1944
- Launched: 22 May 1944
- Sponsored by: Mrs. L. J. Prues, Jr.
- Commissioned: 9 June 1944
- Decommissioned: 14 May 1946
- Stricken: 19 June 1946
- Identification: Hull symbol:LST-570; Code letters:NEWL
- Honors and awards: 2 × battle stars
- Fate: Sold for scrapping, 31 December 1948

General characteristics
- Class & type: LST-542-class tank landing ship
- Displacement: 1,625 long tons (1,651 t) (light); 4,080 long tons (4,145 t) (full (seagoing draft with 1,675 short tons (1,520 t) load)
- Length: 328 ft (100 m) oa
- Beam: 50 ft (15 m)
- Draft: Unloaded: 2 ft 4 in (0.71 m) forward; 7 ft 6 in (2.29 m) aft; Full load: 8 ft 2 in (2.49 m) forward; 14 ft 1 in (4.29 m) aft; Landing with 500 short tons (450 t) load: 3 ft 11 in (1.19 m) forward; 9 ft 10 in (3.00 m) aft
- Installed power: 2 × 900 hp (670 kW) General Motors 12-567A diesel engines, 1,700 shp (1,300 kW)
- Propulsion: 1 × Falk main reduction gears; 2 × screws
- Speed: 12 kn (22 km/h; 14 mph)
- Range: 24,000 nmi (44,000 km; 28,000 mi) at 9 kn (17 km/h; 10 mph) while displacing 3,960 long tons (4,024 t)
- Boats & landing craft carried: 2 x LCVPs
- Capacity: 1,600–1,900 st (22,000–27,000 lb; 10,000–12,000 kg) cargo depending on mission
- Troops: 16 officers, 147 enlisted men
- Complement: 13 officers, 104 enlisted men
- Armament: 2 × twin 40 mm (1.6 in) Bofors guns; 4 × single 40mm Bofors guns; 12 × 20 mm (0.79 in) Oerlikon cannons

Service record
- Operations: Battle of Luzon Lingayen Gulf landings (4–18 January 1945); Battle of Okinawa (1 April–28 June 1945)
- Awards: China Service Medal; American Campaign Medal; Asiatic–Pacific Campaign Medal; World War II Victory Medal; Navy Occupation Service Medal w/Asia Clasp; Philippine Republic Presidential Unit Citation; Philippine Liberation Medal

USS LST-570 was a United States Navy LST-542-class tank landing ship used in the Asiatic-Pacific Theater during World War II.

== Construction and commissioning ==
LST-570 was laid down on 14 April 1944 at Evansville, Indiana, by the Missouri Valley Bridge and Iron Company. She was launched on 22 May 1944, sponsored by Mrs. L. J. Prues Jr., and commissioned on 9 June 1944.

== Service history ==
Commissioned too late to take part in the Normandy invasion, LST-570 still sailed for the Europe-Africa-Middle East Theater before being assigned to the Pacific Theater of Operations.

Records indicate that on 2 July 1944, LST-570 sailed from Seine Bay, France, with 440 Prisoners of War, in Convoy FCM 21, arriving in Falmouth the next day.

She took part in the Philippines campaign, participating in the Invasion of Lingayen Gulf in January 1945 and the Battle of Okinawa in April through June 1945.

Following the war, LST-570 performed occupation duty in the Far East. and saw service in China until mid-November 1945. She returned to the United States and was decommissioned on 14 May 1946 and struck from the Navy list on 19 June that same year. On 31 December 1948, the ship was sold to the Patapsco Scrap Corp., Baltimore, Maryland.

== Honors and awards ==
LST-570 earned two battle stars for her World War II service.

== Sources ==
- "LST-570". Dictionary of American Naval Fighting Ships. Naval History and Heritage Command.
- "USS LST-570". NavSource. 19 December 2014.
- "Convoy FCM.21". Arnold Hague Convoy Database.
