= Japanese minesweeper Tama Maru (1939) =

History

Empire of Japan
- Name: Tama Maru
- Builder: Mitsubishi Jukogyo Hikoshima Zosensho
- Laid down: 3 August 1938
- Launched: 28 February 1939
- Sponsored by: Sankyo Kaiun
- Completed: 1 April 1939
- Acquired: Requisitioned by Imperial Japanese Navy, 12 September 1941
- Reclassified: Reclassified as a submarine chaser on 20 May 1944
- Stricken: 3 May 1947
- Identification: 45388
- Fate: Sunk 8 April 1945
- Notes: Call sign: JCFN

General characteristics
- Type: 396 GRT

Tama Maru (Japanese: 多摩丸) was an auxiliary minesweeper of the Imperial Japanese Navy during World War II.

== History ==
Tama Maru was laid down on 3 August 1938 at the shipyard of Mitsubishi Jukogyo Hikoshima Zosensho at the behest of shipping company, Sankyo Kaiun. She was launched on 28 February 1939 and completed 1 April 1939. On 12 September 1941, she was requisitioned by the Imperial Japanese Navy and converted to an auxiliary minesweeper under Reserve Lieutenant Funaki Takashi (船木隆). Funaki served until 19 May 1943 when he was replaced by Reserve Lieutenant Yoshino Teruhiko (吉野輝彦). On 20 May 1944, she was reclassified as a submarine chaser. In October 1944, Yoshino was replaced by Lieutenant Shinoo Matao (新野尾又雄). She was sunk on 8 April 1945 by the submarine USS Tirante 10 miles (16 km) east of the island of Shokokusanto (Korean: Heuksando) to the southwest of mainland Korea (34°35′N 125°20′E). She was struck from the Navy list on 3 May 1947.
