= HMS Loch More =

Frigate of the Royal Navy

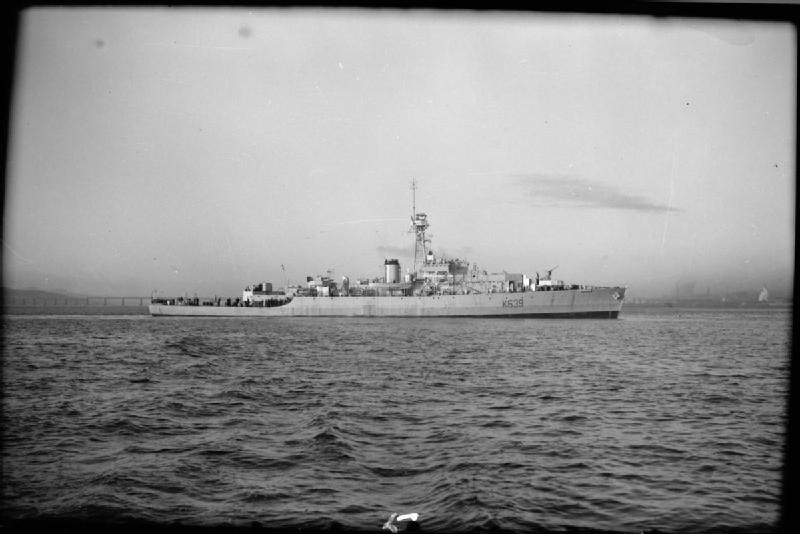
- Loch More in March 1945

History

United Kingdom
- Name: HMS Loch More
- Namesake: Loch More
- Builder: Caledon Shipbuilding & Engineering Company
- Laid down: 16 March 1944
- Launched: 3 October 1944
- Commissioned: 24 February 1945
- Identification: Pennant number K639
- Fate: Scrapped Thos. W. Ward, August 1963

General characteristics
- Class & type: Loch-class frigate
- Displacement: 1,435 long tons (1,458 t)
- Length: 307 ft 9 in (93.80 m)
- Beam: 38 ft 9 in (11.81 m)
- Draught: 8 ft 9 in (2.67 m)
- Propulsion: 2 × Admiralty 3-drum boilers; 2 shafts; 4-cylinder vertical triple expansion reciprocating engines, 5,500 ihp (4,100 kW)
- Speed: 20 knots (37 km/h)
- Range: 9,500 nautical miles (17,600 km) at 12 knots (22 km/h)
- Complement: 114
- Armament: 1 × QF 4 inch Mark V on 1 single mounting HA Mk.III**; 4 × QF 2-pounder Mk.VII on 1 quad mount Mk.VII; 4 × 20 mm Oerlikon A/A on 2 twin mounts Mk.V (or 2 × 40 mm Bofors A/A on 2 single mounts Mk.III); Up to 8 × 20 mm Oerlikon A/A on single mounts Mk.III; 2 × Squid triple barreled A/S mortars; 1 rail and 2 throwers for depth charges

HMS Loch More was a Loch-class frigate of the Royal Navy named after Loch More in Scotland.

== Publications ==
- Colledge, J. J.; Warlow, Ben (2006) [1969]. Ships of the Royal Navy: The Complete Record of All Fighting Ships of the Royal Navy from the 15th Century to the Present (3rd Rev ed.). London: Chatham Publishing. ISBN 978-1-86176-281-8. OCLC 67375475.
