= April 1945 =

Month of 1945

<<	April 1945					>>
Su	Mo	Tu	We	Th	Fr	Sa
1	2	3	4	5	6	7
8	9	10	11	12	13	14
15	16	17	18	19	20	21
22	23	24	25	26	27	28
29	30

The following events occurred in April 1945:

== April 1, 1945 (Sunday) ==
- The Battle of Okinawa began. 50,000 American troops landed on Okinawa against little initial resistance and established a 13-kilometre (8.1 mi) beachhead.
- The Japanese ocean liner-turned-hospital ship Awa Maru was passing through the Taiwan Strait when the American submarine USS Queenfish (SS-393) mistook it for a destroyer, torpedoed and sank it. Of the 2,004 passengers and crew there was only one survivor.
- The 6th Guards Tank Army of the 3rd Ukrainian Front captured the Hungarian city of Sopron on the Austrian border.
- The Battle of Kassel began between German and American troops for the city of Kassel.
- British Commandos began Operation Roast in an effort to push the Germans back to and across the River Po and out of Italy.
- Died: Isaac Wolfe Bernheim, 96, American businessman; William Fairbanks, 50, American actor

== April 2, 1945 (Monday) ==
- Operation Roast ended in British victory in Italy.
- The Soviet 3rd Ukrainian Front launched the Vienna Offensive in order to capture the city of Vienna.
- German submarine U-321 was depth charged and sunk southwest of Ireland by a Vickers Wellington of No. 304 Polish Bomber Squadron.
- Born: Jürgen Drews, singer, actor and restaurateur, in Nauen, Germany; Linda Hunt, actress, in Morristown, New Jersey; Reggie Smith, baseball player, in Shreveport, Louisiana; Don Sutton, baseball player, in Clio, Alabama (d. 2021)

== April 3, 1945 (Tuesday) ==
- The Ninth United States Army captured Münster and attacked the Ruhr Pocket.
- Thousands of prisoners of Buchenwald concentration camp were forced to evacuate and march away from the Allied advance.
- Died: Fritz Vogt, 27, German Waffen-SS Sturmbannführer (killed during an Allied air raid on Fürstenfeld, Austria)

== April 4, 1945 (Wednesday) ==
- The East Pomeranian Offensive ended in Soviet victory.
- The Battle of Kassel ended in Allied victory.
- The Battle of Buchhof and Stein am Kocher began between German and American forces for territory between the Neckar and Kocher Rivers.
- Born: Daniel Cohn-Bendit, politician, in Montauban, France.

== April 5, 1945 (Thursday) ==
- The Georgian uprising on Texel began.
- The first of the incidents at the Freeman Army Airfield near Seymour, Indiana known as the Freeman Field Mutiny took place.
- The Soviet Union renounced the Soviet–Japanese Neutrality Pact of April 1941, explaining that the "prolongation of that pact has become impossible."
- Kuniaki Koiso resigned as Prime Minister of Japan.
- German submarine U-242 struck a mine and sank in St. George's Channel.
- Born: Cem Karaca, rock musician, in Antakya, Turkey (d. 2004)

== April 6, 1945 (Friday) ==
- The Allies began Operation Grapeshot, the Spring offensive in Italy.
- The Battle of Slater's Knoll ended in decisive Australian victory on Bougainville Island.
- Japanese destroyer Amatsukaze was beached at Amoy after an attack by American B-25s.
- American destroyers Bush, Colhoun, Leutze, Morris, Mullany, Newcomb, Rodman and Witter were all hit by Japanese kamikaze attacks off Okinawa. Bush and Colhoun were sunk while Leutze and Necomb were subsequently declared constructive total losses.
- Died: Leon Feldhendler, 34, Polish Jewish resistance fighter (shot through the door of his home by an unknown assailant)

== April 7, 1945 (Saturday) ==
- Operation Kikusui I: The Japanese battleship Yamato and nine other warships launched a suicide attack on Allied forces engaged in the Battle of Okinawa. Yamato was bombed, torpedoed and sunk by U.S. Navy aircraft south of Kyushu with the loss of 2,055 of 2,332 crew. Five other Japanese warships were sunk by American aircraft.
- The Allies began Operation Amherst, a Free French and British Special Air Service attack with the goal of capturing Dutch canals, bridges and airfields intact.
- Germany sent out 120 student pilots to face 1,000 American bomber planes in a suicide operation with the objective of ramming their planes into the U.S. aircraft and then parachuting to safety. Only a few of the pilots managed to hit the bombers and three-quarters of the Luftwaffe pilots were shot down. It was the Sonderkommando Elbe group's first and last mission.
- Kantarō Suzuki replaced Kuniaki Koiso as Prime Minister of Japan.
- German submarine U-1195 was depth charged and sunk southeast of the Isle of Wight by British destroyer Watchman.
- Born: Werner Schroeter, film director, in Georgenthal, Germany (d. 2010)
- Died: Elizabeth Bibesco, 48, English writer and socialite (pneumonia); Seiichi Itō, 54, Japanese admiral (killed in the sinking of the Yamato)

== April 8, 1945 (Sunday) ==
- Operation Amherst ended in Allied victory in the Netherlands.
- The Battle for Cebu City ended in Allied victory.
- The Battle of Lijevče Field ended in victory for the forces of the Independent State of Croatia.
- The 1945 NFL draft was held in New York City. The Chicago Cardinals selected halfback Charley Trippi of the University of Georgia as the #1 overall pick.

== April 9, 1945 (Monday) ==
- The Battle of Königsberg ended in Soviet victory.
- The Battle of West Hunan began as part of the Second Sino-Japanese War.
- The Battle of Bologna began in Italy.
- German cruiser Admiral Scheer was sunk in an RAF raid on Kiel.
- German submarines U-804 and U-843 were sunk in the Kattegat by de Havilland Mosquitos of No. 143 Squadron RAF. U-1065 was sunk in the neighboring Skaggerak by Mosquito aircraft of No. 143 and No. 235 Squadron RAF.
- Australia's Z Special Unit began Operation Opossum with the objective of rescuing the Sultan of Ternate from Ternate Island.
- Charles de Gaulle nationalized Air France.
- The last B-17 rolled off the line at Boeing's assembly plant in Seattle.
- Born: Peter Gammons, sportswriter and media personality, in Boston, Massachusetts
- Died: Dietrich Bonhoeffer, 39, German Lutheran pastor; Wilhelm Canaris, 58, German admiral; Ludwig Gehre, 49, German officer; Hans Oster, 57, German major general; Karl Sack, 48, German jurist; and Theodor Strünck, 50, German lawyer (executed for treason by the Nazis in Flossenbürg concentration camp); Johann Georg Elser, 42, German carpenter who attempted to assassinate Hitler on November 8, 1939 (shot at Dachau concentration camp)

== April 10, 1945 (Tuesday) ==
- The U.S. 84th Infantry Division captured Hanover.
- The U.S. Ninth Army captured Essen.
- The Battle of Authion began in the French Alps.
- In the "day of the great jet massacre," Allied aircraft shot down thirty of 50 Me 262 jet fighters. The loss was fatal to the Luftwaffe and the defense of Berlin was abandoned.
- US Army Corporal Rick Carrier discovers the Nazi Buchenwald concentration camp, leading to the liberation of the camp on April 11th.
- German submarine U-878 was depth charged and sunk in the Bay of Biscay by British warships.
- Died: Gloria Dickson, 27, American actress (asphyxiation from a fire at her home); Hendrik Nicolaas Werkman, 62, Dutch artist, typographer and printer (executed by the Gestapo); Walther Wever, 22, German Luftwaffe fighter ace (shot down near Neuruppin); Carl L. Becker, 81, American historian

== April 11, 1945 (Wednesday) ==
- Operation Opossum ended successfully with the rescue of the Sultan of Ternate and his family.
- Allied commando unit Z Special Unit launched Operation Copper with the objective of capturing a Japanese officer for interrogation and discovering the location of two naval guns of Muschu Island, New Guinea. Eight commandos were landed but only one survived.
- Chile declared war on Japan.
- Born: Christian Quadflieg, television actor and director, in Växjö, Sweden (d. 2023)
- Died: Alfred Meyer, 53, German Nazi official, (suicide)

== April 12, 1945 (Thursday) ==
- U.S. President Franklin D. Roosevelt has an intracerebral hemorrhage, collapsed and dies while sitting for a portrait painting by Elizabeth Shoumatoff at the Little White House in Warm Springs, Georgia. The painting is known as the Unfinished portrait of Franklin D. Roosevelt.
- Harry S. Truman is inaugurated president in the Cabinet Room of the White House.
- A devastating tornado outbreak occurs across the United States, which kills 128 people and injures over 1,000 others. This outbreak would be heavily overshadowed due to the death of President Roosevelt.
- American destroyers Lindsey, Mannert L. Abele and Zellars are severely damaged off Okinawa by kamikaze attacks. Mannert L. Abele is sunk but Lindsey and Zellars survive, although they will be out of action for the rest of the war.
- The Syrmian Front northwest of Belgrade is broken by the Allies.
- The Battle of Authion ends in Allied victory.
- The Battle of Buchhof and Stein am Kocher ends after one week.
- German submarines U-486 and U-1024 are sunk by British warships in the North Sea and Irish Sea, respectively.
- The Berlin Philharmonic gives one of its final performances of the Nazi era at the Philharmonic Hall in Berlin, with various members of the military and political elite in attendance. Robert Heger conducts Brünnhilde's last aria (the Immolation Scene) and the finale from Richard Wagner's Götterdammerung, Beethoven's Violin Concerto, and Anton Bruckner's Romantic Symphony. Historical records confirm that members of the Hitler Youth offered cyanide capsules to the audience as they left the building.
- Died: Franklin D. Roosevelt, 63, 32nd President of the United States (cerebral hemorrhage)

== April 13, 1945 (Friday) ==
- Soviet forces began the Samland Offensive.
- The Vienna Offensive ended with the Soviet capture of Vienna itself.
- German SS and Luftwaffe troops carried out the Gardelegen massacre in the northern German town of Gardelegen. 1,016 slave laborers were forced into a large barn which was then lit on fire.
- The German Ariete-class torpedo boat TA45 (formerly Spica), sailing with TA40 (formerly Pugnale) southeast from Bakar to support an artillery attack on Yugoslav partisans in the area of Senj, was torpedoed and sunk by British motor torpedo boats waiting to ambush them near Cape Glavine; half of the crew was killed.
- Born: Tony Dow, television actor, filmmaker and sculptor, in Hollywood, California; Lowell George, rock musician (Little Feat), in Hollywood, California (d. 1979); Bob Kalsu, football player, in Oklahoma City, Oklahoma (d. 1970)
- Died: Ernst Cassirer, philosopher, 70; Aarne Michaël Tallgren, Finnish prehistorian, 60;

== April 14, 1945 (Saturday) ==
- The Fifth United States Army opened a major offensive into the Po Valley in Italy.
- Bombing of Potsdam
- Admiral Karl Dönitz grouped six U-boats into Wolfpack Seewolf and ordered them to the Atlantic to tie down Allied forces in the region. The Allies suspected that the U-boats were equipped to attack America's eastern seaboard with V-1 or V-2 rockets and launched Operation Teardrop with the objective of sinking them.
- German submarine U-235 was sunk in error by the Kriegsmarine torpedo boat T17.
- A brief memorial service for Franklin D. Roosevelt was held in the East Room of the White House.
- Born: Ritchie Blackmore, guitarist and songwriter (Deep Purple, Rainbow, Blackmore's Night), in Weston-super-Mare, England

== April 15, 1945 (Sunday) ==
- The Race to Berlin began between two Soviet marshals, Georgy Zhukov and Ivan Konev.
- The British 11th Armoured Division liberated Bergen-Belsen concentration camp pursuant to an April 12 agreement with the retreating Germans to surrender the camp peacefully. There they found 60,000 ill and emaciated prisoners and more than 13,000 corpses strewn about the camp.
- The First Canadian Army captured Arnhem.
- 11 Nakajima Ki-84 Hayates attacked US airfields on Okinawa, destroying many aircraft on the ground. The third Japanese Kikusui attack on ships off the island, including kamikazes, was launched.
- US Navy Task Force 58 launched fighter sweeps over Kyushu, claiming 29 Japanese aircraft shot down and 51 destroyed on the ground on the first day.
- Franklin D. Roosevelt was buried on the grounds of his family estate in Hyde Park, New York.
- First flight of North American F-82 Twin Mustang 483887.
- German submarines U-285, U-1063 and U-1235 were all depth charged and sunk by Allied warships in the Atlantic Ocean.
- Died: Joachim Albrecht Eggeling, 60, German Nazi Gauleiter (suicide by gunshot); Friedrich von Rabenau, 60, German general (executed at Flossenbürg concentration camp for opposing the Nazis)

== April 16, 1945 (Monday) ==
- The Battle of Berlin began, opening with the Red Army launching the Battle of the Oder–Neisse and the Battle of the Seelow Heights.
- Canadian forces took Harlingen and occupied Leeuwarden and Groningen in the Netherlands.
- The German transport ship Goya was sunk in the Baltic Sea by Soviet submarine L-3 with the loss of over 6,000 lives.
- German submarines U-78, U-880 and U-1274 were lost to enemy action.
- Oflag IV-C, a prisoner-of-war camp in Colditz Castle, was captured by soldiers of the U.S. 1st Army.
- Death marches from Flossenbürg concentration camp began.
- Harry S. Truman addressed Congress for the first time as president, in a speech broadcast over the major networks. "With great humility I call upon all Americans to help me keep our nation united in defense of those ideals which have been so eloquently proclaimed by Franklin Roosevelt," Truman said. "I want in turn to assure my fellow Americans and all of those who love peace and liberty throughout the world that I will support and defend those ideals with all my strength and all my heart. That is my duty and I shall not shirk it. So that there can be no possible misunderstanding, both Germany and Japan can be certain, beyond any shadow of a doubt, that America will continue the fight for freedom until no vestige of resistance remains!"
- American destroyer USS Pringle was sunk by a kamikaze attack off Okinawa.
- Died: Ernst Bergmann, 53, German philosopher and proponent of Nazism (suicide)

== April 17, 1945 (Tuesday) ==
- The Battle of the Hongorai River began in New Guinea.
- The Martin B-26 Marauder Flak Bait completed a record 200th bombing mission.
- Flooding of the Wieringermeerpolder in the Netherlands, when retreating German troops breached the IJsselmeerdijk
- In the House of Commons, Winston Churchill paid tribute to Franklin Roosevelt as "the greatest American friend we have ever known, and the greatest champion of freedom who has ever brought help and comfort from the new world to the old."
- One-armed baseball player Pete Gray made his major league debut on the St. Louis Browns, going 1-for-4 against the Detroit Tigers.
- Historian Tran Trong Kim was appointed the Prime Minister of the Empire of Vietnam.

== April 18, 1945 (Wednesday) ==
- The First Canadian Army captured the eastern end of the IJsselmeer causeway, trapping German forces in the western Netherlands.
- SS guards began loading 5,000 concentration camp prisoners aboard the immobilized ocean liner Cap Arcona in the Baltic.
- Waffen-SS General Karl Wolff met with Adolf Hitler and disclosed his negotiations with the Allies. Hitler told him to get better terms.
- Benito Mussolini went to Milan to establish his government there. His mistress Clara Petacci came along.
- Died: Arthur Andrew Cipriani, 70, Trinidad and Tobago labour leader and politician; Hans Källner, 46, German general (killed in action in Olomouc, present-day Czech Republic); Joseph F. Merrell, 18, U.S. Army soldier and posthumous recipient of the Medal of Honor (killed in action in Germany); Ernie Pyle, 44, American journalist (killed in action on Iejima); Edward G. Wilkin, 27, U.S. Army soldier and recipient of the Medal of Honor (killed in action in Germany); William, Prince of Albania, 69

== April 19, 1945 (Thursday) ==
- Pyinmana, the base of the Japanese puppet Burma Defence Army, fell to the 5th Indian Division.
- The Battle of the Seelow Heights ended in Soviet/Polish victory.
- The Battle of Odžak began in Croatia between Yugoslav Partisans and the Croatian Armed Forces.
- Richard Dimbleby described Belsen concentration camp on the BBC shortly after its liberation by the British.
- German submarines U-251, U-548 and U-879 were lost to enemy action.
- Johnny Kelley won the Boston Marathon.
- The Rodgers and Hammerstein stage musical Carousel opened at the Majestic Theatre on Broadway.
- Died: Sōsaku Suzuki, 53, Japanese general (killed in action in the Philippines); Fritz Wächtler, 54, Nazi German politician (executed by the Nazis for desertion)

== April 20, 1945 (Friday) ==
- Soviet artillery began shelling Berlin at 11 a.m. on Hitler's 56th birthday. Hitler left his underground Führerbunker to decorate a group of Hitler Youth soldiers on his last trip to the surface. Preparations were made (Operation Seraglio) to evacuate him and his staff to Obersalzberg to make a final stand in the Bavarian mountains, but Hitler himself refused to leave. Hermann Göring and Heinrich Himmler departed the bunker for the last time.
- The Seventh United States Army captured Nuremberg and pushed south.
- Operation Herring began, with American aircraft dropping Italian Co-belligerent Army paratroopers over Northern Italy.
- Mussolini gave the last interview of his life to one of his few remaining loyal followers, the fascist newspaper director Gian Gaetano Cabella. Mussolini declared that "Italy will rise again ... For me, however, it is over."
- The comedy-fantasy film The Horn Blows at Midnight starring Jack Benny was released in the United States.
- "Morotai Mutiny" began: members of the Australian First Tactical Air Force based on the island of Morotai in the Dutch East Indies tendered their resignations to protest their belief that they were being assigned to missions of no military importance and in which they were not specialists; a subsequent inquiry effectively vindicated them.
- Born: Gregory Olsen, entrepreneur, engineer and scientist, in Brooklyn, New York
- Died: Karl Holz, 49, German Nazi Gauleiter (found dead in a barricaded police bunker in Nuremberg; unknown whether suicide or injury sustained in firefight); Willy Liebel, 47, lord mayor of Nuremberg also died there by suicide; Herbert Lange, 35, German SS officer and commandant of Chełmno extermination camp (killed in action during the Battle of Berlin)

== April 21, 1945 (Saturday) ==
- The Battle of Bautzen, one of the final battles of the Eastern Front, began around Bautzen, Germany.
- Hitler ordered a final, all-out attack by the troops in Berlin under the command of Obergruppenführer Felix Steiner. Hitler expected every single man, tank and aircraft to be used in this attack.
- The battle of the Ruhr Pocket ended in Allied victory.
- The Battle of Bologna ended with the Polish II Corps and supporting Allied units capturing Bologna.
- German submarine U-636 was depth charged and sunk west of Ireland by British warships.
- Norbert Masur, German-born representative of Sweden to the World Jewish Congress who had flown in from Stockholm, met in Germany with Heinrich Himmler to agree the release of women from Ravensbrück concentration camp.
- The stage musical Perchance to Dream by Ivor Novello premiered at the Hippodrome Theatre in London.
- Died: Karl Decker, 47, German panzer general (suicide); Martin O. May, 23, U.S. Army soldier and recipient of the Medal of Honor (killed in action on Iegusuku-Yama, Iejima, Ryuku Islands); Walter Model, 54, German field marshal (suicide)

== April 22, 1945 (Sunday) ==
- Hitler held a conference that afternoon in the Führerbunker to discuss the military situation. Upon being informed that the Steiner attack had not happened, and that the Soviets were now entering the northern suburbs of Berlin, he flew into a rage. He denounced the Army, complained that his generals and anyone who had deserted him were cowards and had failed him, then finally conceded that "everything is lost". Over the protests of all those present, Hitler stated that he would stay in Berlin to the absolute end and then shoot himself, rather than try to escape to the south. He allowed those who so wished to leave the bunker.
- Heinrich Himmler secretly met with Count Folke Bernadotte of Sweden and asked him to act as an intermediary to offer the surrender of all German forces in the west. The message took 48 hours to reach the Allies and they did not take it seriously.
- The U.S. Seventh Army crossed the Danube.
- German submarine U-518 was depth charged and sunk north of the Azores by U.S. destroyer escorts Carter and Neal A. Scott.
- The British Fourteenth Army captured Taungoo and Oktwin, Burma.
- Soviet forces liberated the 3,000 remaining inmates of Sachsenhausen concentration camp.
- The Toronto Maple Leafs defeated the Detroit Red Wings 2-1 to win the Stanley Cup, four games to three.
- Richard Strauss completed composition of his Metamorphosen.
- Earth and High Heaven by Canadian author Gwethalyn Graham topped the New York Times Fiction Best Sellers list.
- Died: Wilhelm Cauer, 44, German mathematician and scientist (shot dead by the Soviets during the battle of Berlin); Käthe Kollwitz, 77, German artist; William H. Thomas, 22, U.S. Army soldier and recipient of the Medal of Honor (killed in action in the Zambales Mountains, Luzon, Philippines)

== April 23, 1945 (Monday) ==
- The Race to Berlin saw Soviets approaching first
- German radio broadcast a report that Adolf Hitler was in the "main fighting line" in Berlin and would "remain there despite all rumors." Allied circles doubted the report and suspected (incorrectly) that Hitler was in Bavaria organizing a last stand.
- Hermann Göring sent the so-called Göring telegram, a message asking for permission to assume leadership of the Third Reich. Interpreting the telegram as an act of treason, Hitler relieved Göring of his official titles and ordered his arrest.
- The main Flossenbürg concentration camp was liberated by the 90th Infantry Division, 358th and 359th Regiments (United States Army).
- Action of 23 April 1945: In one of the rare actions of the Pacific War to involve a German submarine, U-183 was sunk off the southern coast of Borneo by American submarine Besugo.
- Antiship Bat missiles were used for the first time in combat when Consolidated PB4Y-2 Privateers of the U.S. Navy launched two of them at Japanese vessels in Balikpapan Harbor in Borneo.
- The 101 arrestees in the Freeman Field Mutiny were released.
- The U.S. Supreme Court decided Cramer v. United States, deciding five-to-four to overturn the conviction of Anthony Cramer, a German-born naturalized citizen, for treason.
- The Institution of Occupational Safety and Health (IOSH) was founded in the United Kingdom when the Institution of Industrial Safety Officers (IISO) was formed as a division of the Royal Society for the Prevention of Accidents (RoSPA). The Institution gained its charitable status in 1962 and would continue to operate as a not-for-profit organisation.

== April 24, 1945 (Tuesday) ==
- Battle of Berlin: Red Army troops completed encirclement of Berlin.
- The Battle of Halbe began on the Eastern Front.
- Shortly after sinking the American destroyer Frederick C. Davis, German submarine U-546 was sunk in the North Atlantic by U.S. Navy ships. With four of the six submarines in Seewolf now lost, Admiral Dönitz disbanded the wolfpack.
- The British Royal Air Force conducted its last significant mission of the war with a raid against Hitler's retreat at Berchtesgaden.
- The final evacuation of the Dachau concentration camp system began, with Jewish prisoners from the main camp's satellite camps arriving at Dachau, to head southwards on a death march away from liberating American troops.
- On Budget Day in the United Kingdom, Chancellor of the Exchequer Sir John Anderson announced that expenditure over the past year had exceeded £6 billion for the first time in history, exceeding revenue by £2.825 billion. He also revealed that the war had cost the country a total of £27 billion through March 31. Anderson presented a "no change" budget and said that it might have to be superseded by another budget before the end of the year due to the tremendous impending events throughout the world.
- The 1945 Major League Baseball All-Star Game scheduled for July 10 at Fenway Park was cancelled due to wartime travel restrictions.
- Born: Doug Clifford, rock drummer (Creedence Clearwater Revival), in Palo Alto, California
- Died: Ernst-Robert Grawitz, 45, German physician and SS officer (probable murder-suicide of his entire family with grenades)

== April 25, 1945 (Wednesday) ==
- Elbe Day: Soviet and American troops met at the Elbe River near Torgau in Germany.
- The East Prussian Offensive and the Samland Offensive ended in Soviet victory.
- The Red Army consolidated its investment of Berlin and cut the telephone lines to the Führerbunker.
- General Robert Ritter von Greim was taken on a risky flight from Munich to Berlin by Hanna Reitsch for a meeting with Hitler. During the flight Greim was injured by enemy fire that struck the cockpit. Hitler promoted Greim to field marshal (making him the last German officer ever to achieve that rank) and gave him command of the Luftwaffe. Greim was then flown back out of Berlin with the only airworthy plane left in the city.
- The National Liberation Committee for Northern Italy (CLNAI) declared a general insurrection, now commemorated as the Festa della Liberazione 'Festival of Liberation'.
- Via telephone hookup, President Truman addressed the delegates at the opening session of the United Nations Conference on International Organization (UNCIO) in San Francisco. "You members of this Conference are to be the architects of the better world," Truman said. "In your hands rests our future. By your labors at this Conference, we shall know if suffering humanity is to achieve a just and lasting peace. Let us labor to achieve a peace which is really worthy of their great sacrifice. We must make certain, by your work here, that another war will be impossible."
- The final Luftwaffe air victories of World War II were recorded when five Allied bombers were shot down over Aussig in the modern-day Czech Republic.
- Born: Stu Cook, bass guitarist (Creedence Clearwater Revival), in Oakland, California; Björn Ulvaeus, musician and member of ABBA, in Gothenburg, Sweden
- Died: Miotero Geninetti, 40, Italian partisan (shot); Walter Gross, 40, German physician and Nazi politician (suicide)

== April 26, 1945 (Thursday) ==
- The Battle of Baguio ended in Allied victory.
- The Battle of Collecchio began around the town of Fornovo di Taro, Italy.
- Philippe Pétain was arrested on the border between Switzerland and France.
- At the first plenary session of UNCIO, State Secretary Edward Stettinius, Jr. said that the world body should work out only a charter. Soviet Foreign Minister Vyacheslav Molotov said that the lessons of the failed League of Nations must be remembered.
- Horka massacre: Germans carried out a massacre of a field hospital column of the 9th Polish Armored Division in Horka, Saxony, killing some 300 Polish POWs, mostly wounded soldiers and medical personnel (see German atrocities committed against Polish prisoners of war).
- The war film Counter-Attack starring Paul Muni and Marguerite Chapman was released.
- Died: Sigmund Rascher, 36, German SS doctor (executed by the Nazis at Dachau concentration camp for fraud)

== April 27, 1945 (Friday) ==
- While attempting to flee to Switzerland, Benito Mussolini and his mistress Clara Petacci were captured by partisans. The next day, both were summarily executed near Lake Como along with twelve other leading fascists. The bodies of Mussolini, Petacci and others were then brought to the Piazzale Loreto in Milan and hung upside down on public display at a gas station.
- The Soviet 1st Ukrainian Front captured Potsdam directly adjacent to the city of Berlin.
- The Battle of Davao began.
- The U.S. Fifth Army reached Genoa, although most of the city was already in the hands of resistance fighters.
- The Western Allies rejected Himmler's proposal to surrender all German forces in the west, interpreting the offer as an attempt to split their alliance with the Soviets.
- The Red Army captured the Berlin airports of Tempelhof and Gatow, preventing the capital from receiving any further supplies by air.
- U.S. troops liberated Kaufering concentration camp and found thousands of corpses.
- The provisional government of Austria headed by Karl Renner asserted its independence from Germany.
- Born: August Wilson, playwright, in Pittsburgh, Pennsylvania (d. 2005)
- Died: Hans Schleif, 43, German architect and member of the SS (suicide)

== April 28, 1945 (Saturday) ==
- Adolf Hitler learned of Himmler's offer to surrender and ordered him to be arrested.
- The U.S. Fifth Army took Alessandria and Vicenza.
- In the Philippines, the Eighth United States Army took Digos and advanced toward Davao City.
- German submarine U-56 was sunk in an RAF raid on Kiel.
- Died: Hermann Fegelein, 38, German SS-Gruppenführer (shot by the Nazis following a trial for desertion); Benito Mussolini, 61, Italian leader of the National Fascist Party and Prime Minister of Italy from 1922 to 1943 (shot by partisans); Clara Petacci, 33, mistress of Benito Mussolini (shot by partisans)

== April 29, 1945 (Sunday) ==
- Hitler and Eva Braun were married in the Führerbunker.
- Adolf Hitler dictated his last will and testament designating Karl Dönitz as his successor.
- At the royal palace in Caserta, two German officers signed the terms of surrender of German forces in Italy. Hostilities would cease at noon on May 2.
- The Battle of Collecchio ended in Allied victory.
- Dachau liberation reprisals: Dachau concentration camp was surrendered to U.S. forces; some SS guards (and camp commandant Heinrich Wicker) were killed by U.S. troops or inmates during the process.
- Hitler's dog Blondi died as a result of a test verifying the potency of the cyanide capsules Hitler had in his possession. The capsules had been given to him by Himmler and, having lost trust in Himmler after the revelation of his attempted negotiations with the Allies behind his back, Hitler wanted to confirm that the capsules were truly fatal.
- German submarines U-286, U-307 and U-1017 were lost to enemy action.
- The Liechtenstein general election was held. The ruling Progressive Citizens' Party led by prime minister Josef Hoop won a majority of eight seats, compared to the coalition partner Patriotic Union winning seven.
- Born: Hugh Hopper, bass guitarist, in Whitstable, Kent, England (d. 2009); Tammi Terrell, singer, in Philadelphia, Pennsylvania (d. 1970)
- Died: Matthias Kleinheisterkamp, 51, German SS-Obergruppenführer (committed suicide after being captured by the Soviets); Malcolm McGregor, 52, American film actor; Achille Starace, 55, Italian fascist leader (shot by partisans)

== April 30, 1945 (Monday) ==
- Death of Adolf Hitler: Adolf Hitler and his wife Eva Braun committed suicide at around 3.30 p.m., when the Red Army was less than 500m (1,640 feet) from the Führerbunker. In accordance with Hitler's Last Will and Testament, Karl Dönitz and Joseph Goebbels took on Hitler's former roles as Head of State and Head of Government of Germany respectively.
- The Battle of Bautzen ended in a localized German victory.
- German submarines U-879 and U-1107 were lost to enemy action.
- German submarine U-326 was torpedoed and sunk west of Brest, France, by an American B-24.
- American photojournalist Lee Miller posed in the bathtub in Hitler's Munich apartment, with the dried mud of that morning's visit to Dachau concntration camp on her boots deliberately dirtying the bathrug.
- The Hockey Hall of Fame named its first inductees. Players: Hobey Baker, Charlie Gardiner, Eddie Gerard, Frank McGee, Howie Morenz, Tommy Phillips, Harvey Pulford, Hod Stuart and Georges Vézina. Builders: H. Montagu Allan and Lord Stanley of Preston.
- Born: Michael J. Smith, American engineer and astronaut, in Beaufort, North Carolina (d. in Space Shuttle Challenger disaster, 1986)
- Died:
  - Adolf Hitler, 56, Führer of Germany (suicide)
    - Eva Braun, 33, German wife of Adolf Hitler (suicide)
  - William Orlando Darby, 34, U.S. Army officer (killed in action in northern Italy)
  - Luisa Ferida, 31, Italian stage and film actress (shot by partisans)
  - Osvaldo Valenti, 39, Italian film actor (shot by partisans)
