= March 1945 =

Month of 1945

<<	March 1945					>>
Su	Mo	Tu	We	Th	Fr	Sa
				1	2	3
4	5	6	7	8	9	10
11	12	13	14	15	16	17
18	19	20	21	22	23	24
25	26	27	28	29	30	31

The following events occurred in March 1945:

== March 1, 1945 (Thursday) ==
- U.S.President Franklin D. Roosevelt reported to Congress on the Yalta Conference. He acknowledged his paralytic illness in public when he opened his speech by saying, "I hope that you will pardon me for this unusual posture of sitting down during the presentation of what I want to say, but I know that you will realize that it makes it a lot easier for me not to have to carry about ten pounds of steel around on the bottom of my legs."
- Iran declared war on Japan retroactive to the previous day.
- The German XXIV (24th) Panzer Corp launched a counteroffensive on the Eastern Front around Lauban.
- The Ninth United States Army captured Mönchengladbach.
- The horror-drama film The Picture of Dorian Gray starring Albert Lewin, George Sanders and Hurd Hatfield premiered in New York City.
- Born: Dirk Benedict, actor, in Helena, Montana

== March 2, 1945 (Friday) ==
- The U.S. Ninth Army captured Neuss while the Third Army took Trier.
- U.S. ships and warplanes bombarded the Ryuku Islands for 48 hours.
- German submarine U-3519 struck a mine and sank in the Baltic Sea.
- Died: Emily Carr, 73, Canadian painter and writer

== March 3, 1945 (Saturday) ==
- The Battle of Manila ended in Allied victory.
- The Germans began Operation Gisela, an aerial intruder operation.
- Finland declared war on Germany retroactive to September 15, 1944.
- In the Pawłokoma massacre, a few hundred Ukrainians were murdered by Poles in the village of Pawłokoma in what was believed to be an act of retaliation for an earlier alleged murder of Poles by the Ukrainian Insurgent Army.
- Died: Aleksandra Samusenko, 22 or 23, Soviet tank commander (crushed under a tank in the dark)

== March 4, 1945 (Sunday) ==
- Operation Gisela ended in German failure.
- The Battle of Kolberg began for the city of Kołobrzeg in German Pomerania.
- Bombings of Switzerland in World War II: Allied aircraft accidentally bombed Basel and Zürich.
- German submarine U-3508 was bombed and sunk at Wilhelmshaven in an Allied air raid.
- Born:
  - Dieter Meier, musician and conceptual artist, in Zürich, Switzerland
  - Tommy Svensson, footballer and manager, in Växjö, Sweden
  - Gary Williams, college basketball coach, in Collingswood, New Jersey
- Died:
  - Lucille La Verne, 72, American actress
  - Mark Sandrich, 44, American filmmaker

== March 5, 1945 (Monday) ==
- The Wehrmacht began calling up 15- and 16-year old boys.
- Advance elements of the U.S. First Army entered Cologne.
- The 19th Army of the Soviet 2nd Belorussian Front captured Köslin.
- The 1945 Resko Przymorskie Dornier Do 24 crash in Kępa, Pomeranian Voivodeship.
- Died: Rupert Downes, 60, and George Alan Vasey, 49, Australian generals (plane crash near Cairns); Albert Richards, 25, British war artist (jeep drove over a landmine)

== March 6, 1945 (Tuesday) ==
- German forces on the Eastern Front launched Operation Spring Awakening, the last major German offensive of the war.
- At Soviet insistence, King Michael of Romania installed Petru Groza as Prime Minister of Romania.
- Soviet authorities began to arrest or kill anyone associated with the Polish Home Army or the Polish government-in-exile in London.
- The Chinese 1st Army captured Lashio, Burma.
- Died: Harry O'Neill, 27, American baseball player and one of only two major leaguers killed in action during WWII (shot by a sniper on Iwo Jima)

== March 7, 1945 (Wednesday) ==
- The Battle of Remagen began in Remagen, Germany.
- Romania declared war on Japan.
- German submarine U-1302 was depth charged and sunk in St. George's Channel by the Canadian frigates Strathadam and Thetford Mines.
- Born: Arthur Lee, drummer, pianist and singer (Love), in Memphis, Tennessee (d. 2006)

== March 8, 1945 (Thursday) ==
- Canadian forces took Xanten, Germany.
- A German force from the Channel Islands carried out the overnight Granville Raid, landing in France and bringing supplies back to base.
- Operation Sunrise: Waffen-SS General Karl Wolff secretly met American OSS head Allen Dulles in Lucerne to open the first concrete discussions of a surrender of German forces in northern Italy.
- Born: Jim Chapman, business leader and congressman, in Washington, D.C.; Micky Dolenz, actor, musician and member of The Monkees, in Los Angeles, California; Anselm Kiefer, painter and sculptor, in Donaueschingen, Germany
- Died: Frederick Bligh Bond, 80, English architect, illustrator, archaeologist and psychical researcher

== March 9, 1945 (Friday) ==
- U.S. warplanes began a 48-hour firebombing of Tokyo that destroyed almost 16 square miles in and around the city and killed between 80,000 and 130,000 civilians.
- Units of the U.S. First Army captured Bonn and Godesburg.
- The Japanese coup d'état in French Indochina occurred.
- Italian Fascist soldiers carried out the Salussola massacre, executing 20 Italian Partisans.
- Benito Mussolini sent a priest to Switzerland to make a proposal to a Vatican envoy that Italy and Germany join with the Allies to defeat Soviet communism. The proposal was not treated seriously.
- U.S. Congress passed the McCarran–Ferguson Act, exempting the business of insurance from most federal regulation.
- Born: Katja Ebstein, singer, in Girlachsdorf, Germany (now Gniewków, Poland); Dennis Rader, serial killer, in Pittsburg, Kansas

== March 10, 1945 (Saturday) ==
- The Battle of Wide Bay was fought, resulting in Allied victory when Australian troops landed at Wide Bay, Papua New Guinea with the objective of isolating Japanese forces to the Gazelle Peninsula.
- The last German forces west of the Rhine withdrew.
- German submarine U-275 struck a mine and sank off Newhaven, East Sussex.
- German submarine U-681 was depth charged and sunk west of the Isles of Scilly by a Consolidated B-24 Liberator aircraft of the U.S. Navy.
- Died: Émile Lemonnier, 51, French general (executed by the Japanese)

== March 11, 1945 (Sunday) ==
- The Royal Air Force sent 1,079 aircraft to bomb Essen and effectively destroyed the city with 4,700 tons of bombs.
- The Battle of Kiauneliškis began between Lithuanian partisans and Soviet forces.
- The British 36th Division in Burma captured Mongmit.
- Albert Kesselring replaced Gerd von Rundstedt as Oberbefehlshaber West.
- Adolf Hitler paid his final visit to the front when he traveled to Bad Freienwalde on the Oder. In a meeting at the Schloss Freienwalde with 9th Army commander Theodor Busse, Hitler implored his officers to hold back the Russians long enough until his new weapons were ready, but he did not disclose what the new weapon was.
- German submarine U-682 was destroyed at Hamburg in an American air raid.
- Born: Dock Ellis, baseball player, in Los Angeles, California (d. 2008)

== March 12, 1945 (Monday) ==
- The Soviet 1st Belorussian Front took Küstrin.
- Santa Fe riot: Four internees at a Japanese internment camp near Santa Fe, New Mexico were seriously wounded after a scuffle broke out between internees and Border Patrol agents guarding the facility that resulted in the use of tear gas and batons.
- Benito Mussolini escaped injury when an Allied fighter plane strafed his convoy of cars near Lake Garda.
- German submarine U-260 struck a mine and was scuttled south of Ireland.
- Died: Friedrich Fromm, 56, German army officer (executed by the Nazis by firing squad for failing to act against the 20 July bomb plot)

== March 13, 1945 (Tuesday) ==
- The Battle of Kiauneliškis ended with the destruction of the Lithuanian partisan bunkers.
- Born: Anatoly Fomenko, mathematician, in Stalino, USSR, Ukrainian SSR

== March 14, 1945 (Wednesday) ==
- The Soviet 2nd Ukrainian Front took Zvolen.
- German submarine U-714 was depth charged and sunk off Eyemouth, Berwickshire by South African frigate Natal and British destroyer Wivern.
- German submarine U-1021 struck a mine and sank in the Bristol Channel.

== March 15, 1945 (Thursday) ==
- The Red Army launched the Upper Silesian Offensive.
- Operation Spring Awakening ended in German failure.
- Juan José Arévalo became 24th President of Guatemala.
- EC Comics published its first comic book, the concluding half of a biography of Jesus called Picture Stories from the Bible. The first issue of the series had been published by DC Comics.

== March 16, 1945 (Friday) ==
- German submarine U-367 struck a mine and sank northeast of Danzig.
- President Roosevelt said at a news conference that as a matter of decency, Americans would have to tighten their belts so food could be shipped to war-ravaged countries to keep people from starving.
- The Air Technical Services Command of the United States Army Air Forces signed a contract with Bell Aircraft for the construction of three experimental aircraft to explore transonic research issues, ultimately designated the Bell X-1.
- Died: Börries von Münchhausen, 70, German poet and Nazi activist (suicide by overdose of sleeping pills)

== March 17, 1945 (Saturday) ==
- Firebombing of Kobe destroyed 21% of Kobe's urban area with 8,841 residents killed.
- The Ludendorff Bridge over the Rhine at Remagen collapsed and killed 25 American engineers, although the First U.S. Army had already constructed other crossings.
- The Kriegsmarine completed the evacuation of 75,000 civilians and soldiers from the Kolberg pocket overnight.
- Born: Elis Regina, singer, in Porto Alegre, Brazil (d. 1982)

== March 18, 1945 (Sunday) ==
- An air battle was fought in the skies over Berlin when 1,329 Allied bombers and 700 long-range fighters were met by the Luftwaffe using the new Me 262s and air-to-air rockets. The U.S. Eighth Air Force lost six Mustangs and 13 bombers while the Luftwaffe only lost two planes in return despite being outnumbered 32 to 1. However, the Allies still dropped 3,000 tons of bombs in the heaviest daylight raid on Berlin of the war.
- The Battle of Kolberg ended in Soviet and Polish victory.
- The Battle of the Ligurian Sea was fought between British and German naval forces in the Gulf of Genoa. The Germans lost two torpedo boats and had a destroyer damaged while the British took light damage to one destroyer in return.
- The Battle of the Visayas began in the Philippines.
- All schools and universities in Tokyo were closed and everyone over the age of six was ordered to do war work.
- German submarine U-866 was depth charged and sunk in the Atlantic Ocean by American destroyer escorts.
- Two days of parliamentary elections concluded in Finland. The Social Democratic Party of Finland lost 35 seats but maintained a one-seat plurality over the new Finnish People's Democratic League.

== March 19, 1945 (Monday) ==
- The aircraft carrier USS Franklin was bombed and heavily damaged off the Japanese mainland by Japanese aircraft, killing more than 800 crew.
- Hitler issued the Nero Decree, ordering the destruction of German infrastructure to prevent their use by Allied forces. Albert Speer and the army chiefs strongly resisted this and conspired to delay the order's implementation.
- All remaining U-boats in the Baltic Sea were withdrawn and transferred to the west.
- The Battle of Bacsil Ridge was fought between Japanese and Filipino forces, resulting in Filipino victory.
- In Burma, the 19th Indian Division captured Mandalay while the British 36th Division took Mogok.
- The Soviet Union notified Turkey that their non-aggression pact signed in 1925 would not be renewed after it expired in November. Turkey responded by rejecting Soviet demands for territorial concessions and a revision of the Montreux Convention.

== March 20, 1945 (Tuesday) ==
- The U.S. Seventh Army captured Saarbrücken.
- Hitler made his final public appearance, awarding medals to Hitler Youth soldiers.
- The Arnsberg Forest massacre begins.
- Australian forces carried out Operation Platypus, in which troops from Z Special Unit were inserted into the Balikpapan area of Borneo to gather information and organize locals for resistance against the Japanese.
- France signed an economic pact with Belgium, the Netherlands and Luxembourg.
- Gotthard Heinrici replaced Heinrich Himmler as commander of Army Group Vistula.
- Born: Jay Ingram, author and broadcaster, in Canada; Bobby Jameson, singer and songwriter, in Geneva, Illinois (d. 2015); Pat Riley, basketball player, coach and executive, in Rome, New York
- Died: Lord Alfred Douglas, 74, English author, poet and translator

== March 21, 1945 (Wednesday) ==
- The Japanese deployed the first Yokosuka MXY7 Ohka suicide aircraft, slung under 16 Betty bombers that were part of a group sent to attack the American fleet off Okinawa. The flight was a disaster for the Japanese when the group was intercepted by American fighters a full 60 miles (97 km) from the American task force, and all the bombers were shot down. American pilots noted that the Bettys were flying unusually slow and carrying an unusual payload, but the significance of this was not realized at the time.
- The Battle of West Henan–North Hubei began as part of the Second Sino-Japanese War.
- British aircraft executed Operation Carthage, an air raid on Copenhagen, Denmark. The Danish headquarters of the Gestapo was destroyed but a nearby boarding school was also hit and the raid caused a total of 125 civilian deaths.
- The Allies executed Operation Bowler, an air attack on Venice harbour.

== March 22, 1945 (Thursday) ==
- The Western Allied invasion of Germany began.
- The Arab League was established.
- The romantic comedy film Without Love starring Spencer Tracy, Katharine Hepburn and Lucille Ball premiered in New York.
- The stage musical The Firebrand of Florence with music by Kurt Weill, lyrics by Ira Gershwin and book by Edwin Justus Mayer and Gershwin premiered at the Alvin Theatre on Broadway.
- Died: Eliyahu Bet-Zuri, 23, and Eliyahu Hakim, 20, members of the Lehi Jewish paramilitary group (executed for the 1944 assassination of Lord Moyne); Enrico Caviglia, 82, Italian Army officer; John Hessin Clarke, 87, Associate Justice of the United States Supreme Court from 1916 to 1922

== March 23, 1945 (Friday) ==
- Adolf Hitler approved a formal withdrawal across the Rhine, but by that time all German forces who were going to make it back had already gone.
- At night the Western Allies began Operation Plunder, the crossing of the Rhine.
- The last Massacre in Arnsberg Forest ends.
- U.S. and Filipino troops captured San Fernando on Luzon.
- The Indian 20th Infantry Division took Wundwin, Burma.
- Born: Franco Battiato, Italian singer and songwriter, in Ionia (Italy) (d. 2021).
- Died: Élisabeth de Rothschild, 43, member by marriage of the Rothschild family (died in Ravensbrück concentration camp)

== March 24, 1945 (Saturday) ==
- As part of Operation Plunder, American, British and Canadian troops carried out Operation Varsity, an airborne drop around Wesel, Germany.
- It was reported from Cairo that archaeologists had located the ancient Egyptian city of Heliopolis.
- Billboard magazine revised its system for tabulating a chart of the leading songs in the United States with the creation of a new composite chart called the Honor Roll of Hits, combining best-selling retail records, records most played on the air and the most played jukebox records. "Ac-Cent-Tchu-Ate the Positive" by Johnny Mercer was the first #1 of this new chart, which would exist until being supplanted by the creation of the Hot 100 in 1958.

== March 25, 1945 (Sunday) ==
- The Battle of Remagen ended in Allied victory.
- The Red Army began the Bratislava–Brno Offensive in Slovakia.
- Winston Churchill, accompanied by Field Marshal Bernard Montgomery, briefly crossed the Rhine near Wesel in an Allied landing craft, symbolizing the crossing of the top British leader over the traditional frontier of Germany that no foreign army had crossed since the age of Napoleon. The excursion, which ventured as far as a bridge still under enemy fire, was quite dangerous and General Eisenhower later noted that if he had been there he never would have allowed Churchill to cross the river at that time.
- Died: Franz Oppenhoff, 42, German lawyer and Mayor of the city of Aachen (assassinated on the order of Heinrich Himmler); William H. Rupertus, 55, American major general and author of the Rifleman's Creed (heart attack)

== March 26, 1945 (Monday) ==
- The Battle of Iwo Jima ended in American victory. Japanese general Tadamichi Kuribayashi is believed to have died on or around this date, probably killed in action.
- The Battle for Cebu City began in the Philippines.
- American destroyer USS Halligan was lost to a mine off Okinawa. The ship was abandoned and ran aground on Tokashiki the following day.
- German submarine U-399 was depth charged and sunk off Land's End by British frigate Duckworth.
- The U.S. Supreme Court decided United States v. Willow River Power Co.
- Born: Mikhail Voronin, gymnast, in Moscow, USSR (d. 2004)
- Died: David Lloyd George, 82, British Liberal politician and Prime Minister of the United Kingdom from 1916 to 1922; Tadamichi Kuribayashi, 53, Japanese general (believed to have been killed in action on this date on Iwo Jima although his body was never identified); Boris Shaposhnikov, 62, Soviet military commander

== March 27, 1945 (Tuesday) ==
- The Germans fired their last V-2 rockets from their only remaining launch site in the Netherlands. Almost 200 civilians in England and Belgium were killed in this final attack.
- Argentina declared war on Germany and Japan.
- German submarine U-722 was depth charged and sunk west of Scotland by British frigates.
- Oklahoma A&M defeated NYU 49-45 in the championship game of the NCAA Men's Division I Basketball Tournament played at Madison Square Garden in New York City.
- Died: Karl Bülowius, 55, German military officer (committed suicide in a POW camp); Halid Ziya Uşaklıgil, 78 or 79, Turkish author, poet and playwright

== March 28, 1945 (Wednesday) ==
- The Soviet 3rd Belorussian Front captured the medieval castle of Balga and completed the destruction of the German 4th Army except for those who had managed to evacuate.
- The U.S. 80th Infantry Division captured Wiesbaden.
- The Battle of Slater's Knoll began between Australian and Japanese forces on Bougainville Island.
- Hitler sacked Heinz Guderian as Chief of the OKH General Staff, the last battlefield commander from the early days of the war still active. Guderian was replaced with Hans Krebs.
- The American submarine Trigger was sunk by Japanese vessels in the East China Sea.
- Born: Rodrigo Duterte, 16th President of the Philippines, in Maasin, Southern Leyte.

== March 29, 1945 (Thursday) ==
- The battle of the Heiligenbeil Pocket ended in Soviet victory.
- The Deutsch Schützen massacre occurred when approximately 60 Jewish forced laborers were killed in Deutsch Schützen-Eisenberg, Austria.
- Born: Walt Frazier, basketball player, in Atlanta, Georgia; Willem Ruis, game show presenter, in Haarlem, Netherlands (d. 1986)
- Died: Ferenc Csik, 31, Hungarian swimmer (killed in Sopron during an Allied air raid)

== March 30, 1945 (Friday) ==
- The Battle of Lijevče Field began near Banja Luka between Croatian and Chetnik forces.
- The 2nd Shock Army of the 2nd Belorussian Front captured Danzig.
- Born: Eric Clapton, rock and blues guitarist, singer and songwriter, in Ripley, Surrey, England; Ron Garvin, professional wrestler, in Montreal, Quebec, Canada
- Died: Élise Rivet, 55, Algerian-born nun (killed in Ravensbrück concentration camp); Maurice Rose, 45, U.S. Army general (killed in action near Paderborn, Germany)

== March 31, 1945 (Saturday) ==
- The Upper Silesian Offensive ended in Soviet victory.
- Japanese submarine I-8 was sunk off Okinawa by American destroyers Morrison and Stockton.
- "My Dreams Are Getting Better All the Time" by Les Brown topped the Billboard singles charts.
- Born: Gabe Kaplan, comedian, actor and professional poker player, in Brooklyn, New York
- Died: Harriet Boyd Hawes, 73, American archaeologist; Hans Fischer, 63, German organic chemist and Nobel laureate; Torgny Segerstedt, 68, Swedish scholar and newspaper editor
