= Battle of Kiauneliškis =

- Part of the guerrilla war in Lithuania
Date	March 11–13, 1945
Location	South of Kiauneliškis, Švenčionys District Municipality 55°16′38″N 25°51′43″E
Result	Partisan bunkers destroyed

Belligerents
Lithuanian partisans	NKVD and destruction battalions

Commanders and leaders
Antanas Krinickas (code name Romelis) (WIA); Apolinaras Jurčys (code name Vytenis) †	

Strength
About 120	500–2,000

Casualties and losses
63–80	300?

The Battle of Kiauneliškis was fought on March 11–13, 1945 between the Lithuanian partisans and Soviet forces. The Lithuanians were entrenched in two large bunkers and refused to surrender. After three days of fighting, both bunkers were destroyed with heavy casualties on both sides.

== Background ==
As the Red Army continued to advance towards Nazi Germany, Lithuania was occupied by the Soviet Union. The Lithuanians fled forceful conscription into the Red Army and hid in the forests. A particularly large group, known as the Tiger Detachment (Lithuanian: Tigro rinktinė), organized themselves in the Labanoras Forest. A platoon, commanded by Antanas Krinickas, built a large Margis Bunker with trenches south of the Kiauneliškis village in fall 1944. Another bunker, named after Kaunas, was built by men commanded by Apolinaras Jurčys in winter 1945.

== Battle ==
In March 1945, the NKVD sent troops and stribai (members of destruction battalions) from Švenčionys, Švenčionėliai, Saldutiškis to destroy the Kaunas Bunker. The partisans successfully held off the initial Soviet attacks, but soon their camp and bunker were surrounded. The majority of the partisans from the Kaunas Bunker managed to break through the Soviet encirclement and escape, leaving only seven men behind. When the partisans from the Margis Bunker came to their assistance, the Soviets learned about the existence of the second camp and surrounded it as well. The partisans from the Margis Bunker did not attempt to break through and escape the assault. Fierce exchanges of fire continued into the second day, when Soviet forces were unexpectedly attacked by 300 men from the Tiger Detachment. Conflicting accounts claim the partisans inside the bunkers believed that it was a clever ruse intended to bring them out of hiding and into an ambush or that the reinforcements believed they were too late and thus did not press further. Either way, the men from the Tiger Detachment retreated leaving the partisans in the bunkers to defend themselves.

The seven men inside the Kaunas Bunker started running out of ammunition. Preferring death to being captured by the Soviets, they decided to use the last grenade to kill themselves. Six men were killed by the blast, while the seventh survived. The men inside the Margis Bunker continued to resist. The Soviets would toss in grenades, but the partisans would grab them and toss them back to the Russians. The Soviets then brought anti-tank grenades and mortars. The heavy fire effectively buried the bunker preventing ventilation and suffocating everyone inside.

== Aftermath ==
On March 14, the NKVD brought residents of nearby villages to deal with the bodies. Witnesses counted 300 Soviet bodies. It is known that four Russian officers, including a colonel, were buried in Švenčionys. The dead partisans were loaded onto a train and brought to Švenčionys where they were publicly displayed for a day. The bodies were later buried in a mass grave near Cirkliškis Manor.
