= Attack Force Z =

- Region 4 DVD cover
- Directed by: Tim Burstall
- Screenplay by: Roger Marshall
- Produced by: Lee Robinson
- Starring: John Phillip Law; Mel Gibson; Sam Neill; Chris Haywood; John Waters; Koo Chuan Hsiung; Sylvia Chang; O Ti
- Cinematography: Hung-Chung Lin
- Edited by: David Stiven
- Music by: Eric Jupp
- Production companies: John McCallum Productions; Central Motion Picture Corporation
- Distributed by: Roadshow Film Distributors (Australia)
- Release dates: 18 May 1981 (Cannes); 11 June 1982 (Australia)
- Running time: 93 minutes
- Country: Australia; Taiwan
- Language: English
- Box office: $88,000 (Australia)

Attack Force Z (alternatively titled The Z Men) is a 1981 war film directed by Tim Burstall, and starring John Phillip Law, Mel Gibson, Sam Neill, and Koo Chuan Hsiung. It dramatizes the exploits of Z Special Unit, also known as Z Force, a joint Australian, British and New Zealand commando unit. Its main brief was to conduct reconnaissance and sabotage missions throughout Imperial Japanese-occupied Southeast Asia during the Second World War.

The film is noted for starring Mel Gibson and Sam Neill, who were relatively unknown in the US at the time but who went on to become international stars. It was an international co-production between Australia and Taiwan, and was filmed on-location in Taiwan. It was screened at the Cannes Film Festival on 18 May 1981.

== Plot ==
In the Straits of Sembaleng, five men are dispatched by submarine in Klepper canoes to rescue survivors of a shot-down plane on a nearby island which is occupied by the Imperial Japanese Army. Led by Paul Kelly, an inexperienced commando officer, the team secretly lands on the island and hides their kayaks. As they venture inland, Ted 'Kingo' King is hit by fire from an unseen machine gun post, the team quickly eliminates the Japanese defenders and return to their wounded comrade. King has been hit on the leg, the bullet smashing his kneecap. King cannot be allowed to fall into enemy hands and compromise the mission under interrogation, and after sharing a cigarette with him, Costello shoots him. The four remaining men return to their search; coming across a rice farmer, they learn of the area in which the plane crashed. The rice farmer is also killed in order to preserve secrecy.

But as they near their destination they spot a Japanese squad at a local house, after the Japanese leave, they enter the house and meet the local resistance leader Lin, his grown-up daughter Chien Hua and her younger brothers and sisters. With a guide to lead them, they head off to the plane but are attacked by Japanese soldiers at a Buddhist temple. Separated from the rest, interpreter Jan Veitch ends up returning to Lin's house where Chien Hua hides him from the returning Japanese. After the deaths of their soldiers, the Japanese officers Watanabe and Imanaka torture Chien to tell them the location of her father, who they believe is hiding the survivors of the crashed plane, but Chien Hua refuses. Lin's son Shaw Hu falsely tells the Japanese that Lin, the Z men, and the plane's survivors are heading for the island's capital. All the Japanese leave except for two soldiers guarding Chien Hua; Veitch kills both with help of Shaw Hu. During the battle, Costello is wounded in the arm and cornered by a machine gunner and throws a grenade at the machine gunner but is shot and killed in the process.

Meanwhile, within sight of the plane, Kelly watches as locals blow up the wreckage. Lin is evasive, and after quizzing the inhabitants of a village, the team head on to the plane. Kelly manages to get Lin to tell them that the two survivors are being taken to his home, so they turn around and head back. In the capital, Veitch is led to the survivors. One of them is a defecting Japanese government official Imoguchi, and he is believed to hold a secret that could end the war faster. Only Kelly knows that he must be rescued at any cost - or killed. As the pieces of the puzzle begin to fall together, Kelly must persuade his own men that Imoguchi is worth rescuing and the local resistance that it is worth fighting against their Japanese enemies.

== Cast ==
- John Phillip Law as Lieutenant J.A. (Jan) Veitch
- Mel Gibson as Captain P.G. (Paul) Kelly
- Sam Neill as Sergeant D.J. (Danny) Costello
- Chris Haywood as Able Seaman A.D. 'Sparrer' Bird
- John Waters as Sub Lt. Ted 'Kingo' King
- Ku Chun as Rice farmer
- Sylvia Chang as Chien Hua
- O Ti as Shaw Hu
- Koo Chuan Hsiung as Lin Chan-Lang

== Production ==
The script was based on a real-life commando rescue raid, Operation Opossum, where a team of commandos rescued the local sultan on the Japanese-held island of Ternate near Borneo.

The film was originally entitled The Z Men and was to be directed by Phillip Noyce. Pre-production commenced in Taiwan where for six weeks Noyce worked on the script with writer Michael Cove. However, Noyce clashed with the producers - McCallum later claimed in particular that Noyce refused to use one of the Chinese actors who had been cast in a small role - and was fired the night before shooting was meant to start. He was replaced by Tim Burstall in November 1979.

Filming was further delayed by constant rain and re-writing of the script. Among the changes made were adding a fifth character to the team - a soldier played by John Waters who would be killed within the opening ten minutes by one of their own men.

This film was based on the book 'The Night the Z Men Landed' written by Gene Janes under his pseudonym of several military books, Owen Gibson, in the 1960s and published by Calvert Publishing in Sydney. There was a legal dispute between the author and McCallum Productions over the screen rights. Janes took the production company to court holding up the release of the film and was finally awarded the rights in an out of court settlement.

== Reception ==
Attack Force Z was only released theatrically in Australia in Melbourne, where it took $88,000 at the box office, which is equivalent to $364,484 in 2022 dollars. After the film's release, Tim Burstall was quoted as saying:

It sold everywhere, sold all over the world, and it got its money back. And it did perform the task of getting some co-productions going with the East, which was useful and very important. But it's always awful when you take over from somebody else - and Phil is a friend - but he really wanted to do something quite different and I was regarded as much more of a whore, I suppose.

Mel Gibson later called the film "pretty woeful... it's so bad, it's funny."

John McCallum later said he and Robinson wanted to make another film in Asia, about drug running in Thailand "starting from the poppies and the hill factories where they distil the damned stuff and send it down to Bangkok" but were not allowed to make it because of the dangers involved in filming in Thailand.

== See also ==
- The Highest Honour — Another film about Z Special Unit made by the same producers in 1983.
