= February 1945 =

Month of 1945

<<	February 1945					>>
Su	Mo	Tu	We	Th	Fr	Sa
				1	2	3
4	5	6	7	8	9	10
11	12	13	14	15	16	17
18	19	20	21	22	23	24
25	26	27	28

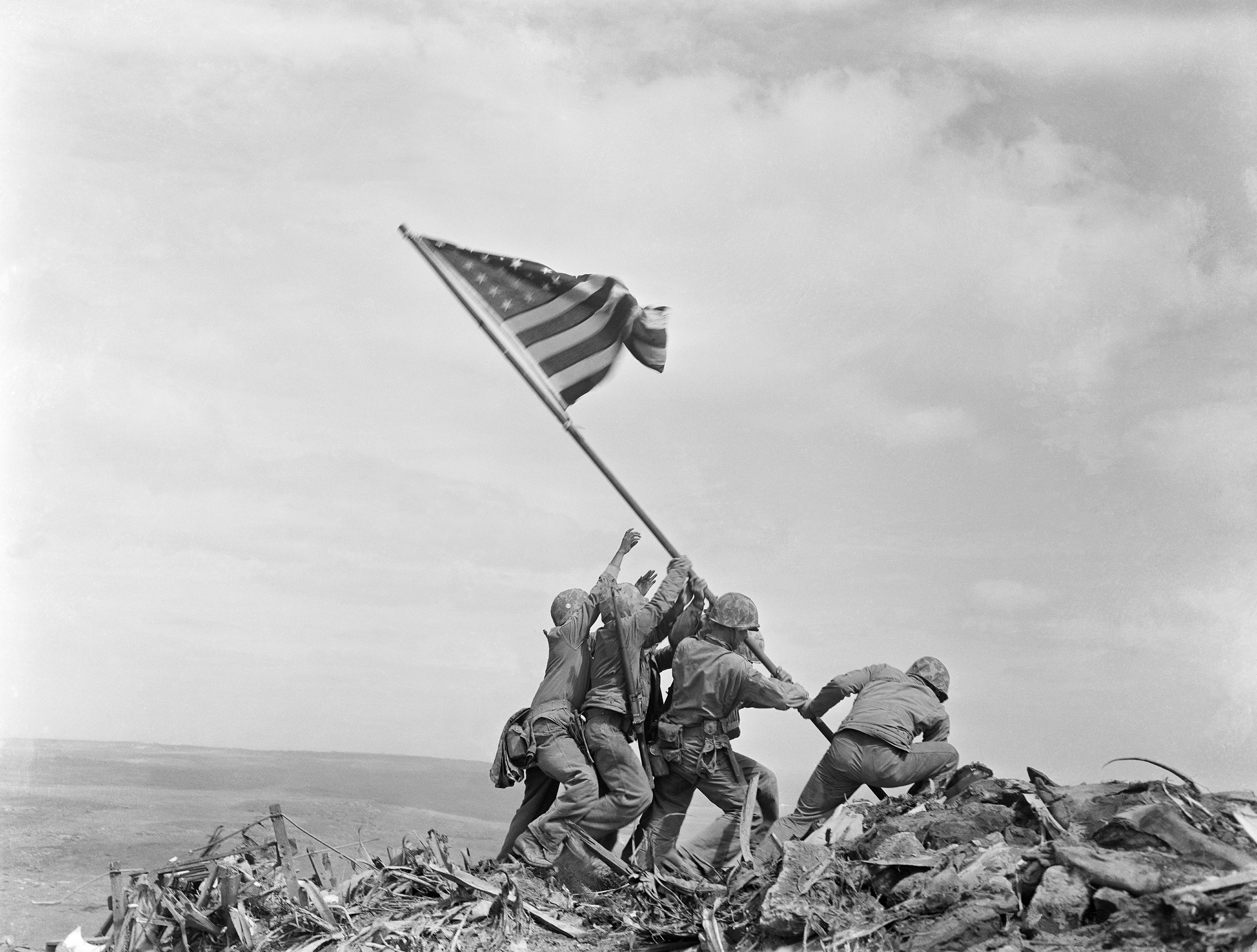
February 23, 1945: Raising the Flag on Iwo Jima

The following events occurred in February 1945:

== February 1, 1945 (Thursday) ==
- The Second Battle of Kesternich ended in U.S. victory.
- Soviet forces reached Liebenow.
- The North Tube of the Lincoln Tunnel was opened.
- Died: Prince Kiril of Bulgaria, 49; Bogdan Filov. 61, Prime Minister of Bulgaria from 1940 to 1943 (executed by firing squad)

== February 2, 1945 (Friday) ==
- The Vistula–Oder Offensive ended in Soviet victory.
- The liberation of Auschwitz concentration camp was reported by Boris Polevoy in the Soviet newspaper Pravda but without mention that the majority of the inmates were Jewish, and the report attracted little notice at the time.
- The four-day Malta Conference between Franklin D. Roosevelt and Winston Churchill ended with an agreement to withdraw two divisions from Greece and three from Italy to reinforce northwest Europe. They proceeded to Yalta for a conference with Joseph Stalin.
- Died: Adolf Brand, 70, German writer, anarchist and gay rights activist (killed in an Allied bombing raid); Karl Friedrich Goerdeler, 60, German politician (hanged by the Nazis for treason); Joe Hunt, 25, American tennis player (killed in a plane crash during a military training exercise)

== February 3, 1945 (Saturday) ==
- Berlin suffered its worst air raid of the war when 1,500 USAAF bombers led by Lt. Col. Robert Rosenthal dropped more than 2,000 tons of bombs on the city.
- The Battle of Manila began.
- The Soviets completed the Sandomierz–Silesian Offensive.
- Born: Roy 'Chubby' Brown, stand-up comedian, in Grangetown, North Yorkshire, England; Bob Griese, NFL quarterback, in Evansville, Indiana
- Died: Roland Freisler, 51, German Nazi lawyer and judge (killed in the aforementioned USAAF bombing raid on Berlin)

== February 4, 1945 (Sunday) ==
- The Yalta Conference began in the Crimean city of Yalta. Franklin D. Roosevelt, Winston Churchill and Joseph Stalin met to discuss the reorganization of postwar Europe.
- The Battle of Pokoku and Irrawaddy River operations began in Burma.
- American submarine USS Barbel was sunk by Japanese aircraft off Palawan.
- The King's Cross railway accident killed two passengers and injured 26 at London King's Cross railway station.

== February 5, 1945 (Monday) ==
- Ecuador declared war on Japan.
- Soviet forces crossed the Oder at Brzeg.
- Born: Sarah Weddington, attorney, law professor and member of the Texas House of Representatives, in Abilene, Texas (d. 2021)
- Died: Denise Bloch, 29, Lilian Rolfe, 30, and Violette Szabo, 23, French secret agents (executed by the Nazis in the Ravensbrück concentration camp)

== February 6, 1945 (Tuesday) ==
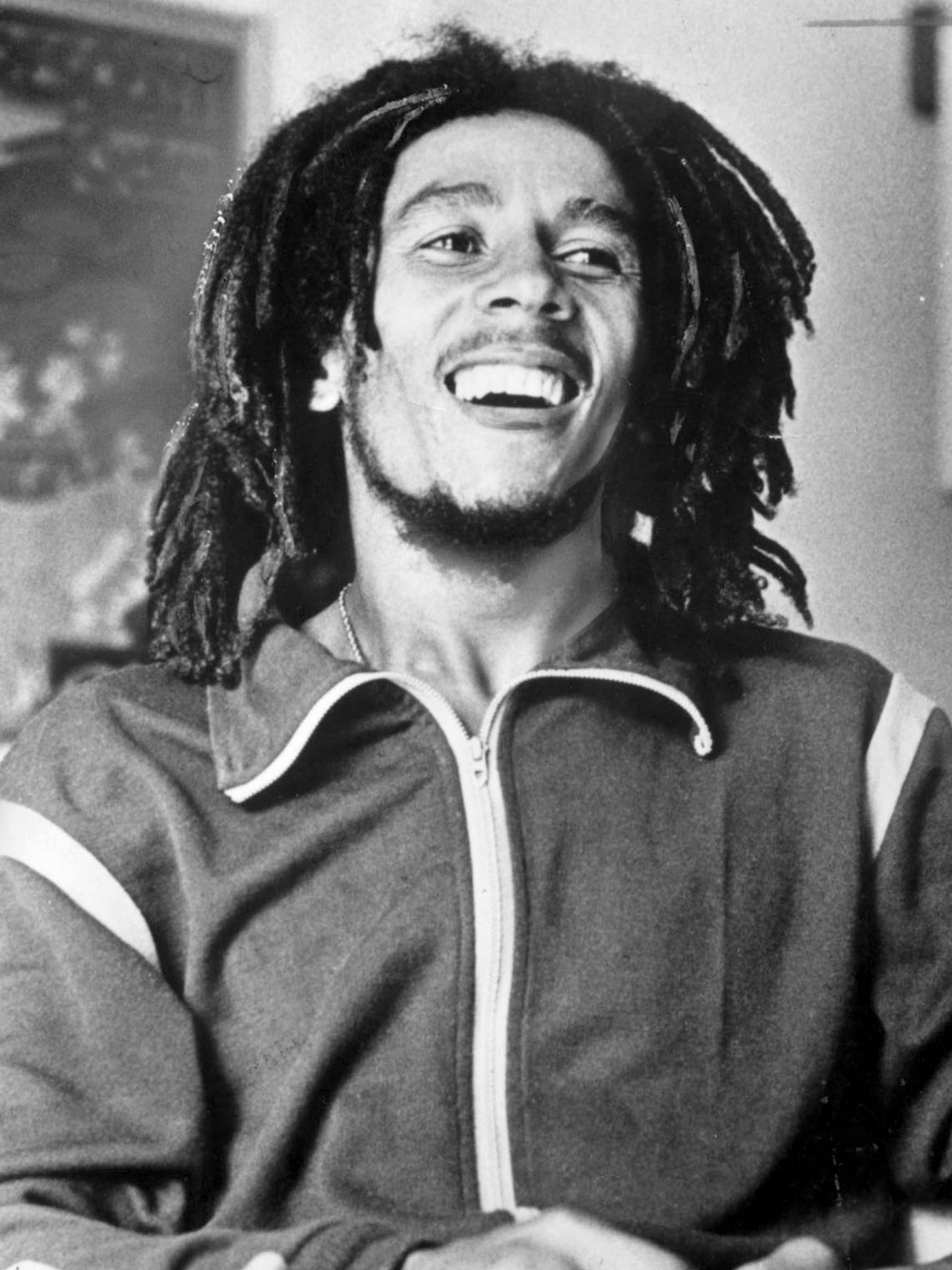
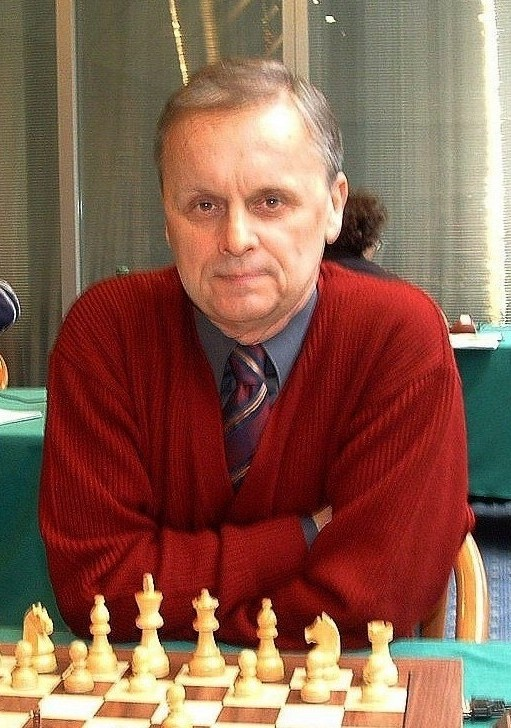
Marley and his target, Cebalo
- General Douglas MacArthur announced the capture of Manila and the liberation of 5,000 prisoners.
- Yugoslav Partisans began the Mostar operation.
- Wilhelm Mohnke was named commandant of the Reich Chancellery sector in Berlin.
- Born:
  - Bob Marley, reggae musician, in Nine Mile, Jamaica (d. 1981)
  - George Mudie, British politician
  - Mišo Cebalo, Croatian chess grandmaster (d. 2022).
- Died: Robert Brasillach, 35, French author and journalist (executed for advocating pro-fascist and collaborationist views)

== February 7, 1945 (Wednesday) ==
- Paraguay declared war on Germany and Japan.
- The 2nd Ukrainian Front captured the southern rail station at Buda.
- Born: Gerald Davies, rugby player, in Llansaint, Wales

== February 8, 1945 (Thursday) ==
- The Red Army began the Lower Silesian Offensive.
- The Western Allies began Operation Veritable, a pincer movement aimed at clearing German forces from the area between the Rhine and Meuse rivers.
- A total of 350 American Prisoners of War were placed in boxcars heading towards Berga, a Subcamp of Bauchenwald Concentration Camp, in contravention of the Geneva and Hague Conventions.
- Died: Day G. Turner, 23, U.S. Army soldier and posthumous recipient of the Medal of Honor (killed in action)

== February 9, 1945 (Friday) ==
- Black Friday: A force of Allied Bristol Beaufighter aircraft suffered heavy casualties during an unsuccessful attack on the German destroyer Z33 and its escorting vessels.
- The Allies reached Millingen on the Rhine.
- The Battle of Tsimba Ridge ended in Australian victory.
- Action of 9 February 1945: German submarine U-864 was sunk west of Bergen, Norway by the British submarine Venturer. To date this remains the only time in history one submarine has intentionally sunk another submarine while both were fully submerged.
- Adolf Hitler viewed a post-war model of his hometown of Linz, Austria. He planned to have Linz surpass Vienna as Austria's greatest city.
- Born: Mia Farrow, actress, activist and fashion model, in Los Angeles, California

== February 10, 1945 (Saturday) ==
- The Battle of Hürtgen Forest ended in German defensive victory.
- German forces opened the Schwammenauel Dam to delay the Allied advance in the west.
- The Red Army began the East Pomeranian Offensive.
- The Soviet 1st Belorussian Front captured Elbing.
- The German passenger liner General von Steuben was torpedoed and sunk in the Baltic Sea by Soviet submarine S-13, resulting in the loss of over 4,000 lives.
- Died: Anacleto Díaz, 66, Filipino jurist and Associate Justice of the Supreme Court (executed by the Japanese)

== February 11, 1945 (Sunday) ==
- The Yalta Conference concluded. Churchill, Roosevelt and Stalin signed a joint declaration affirming guidelines for the end of the war and maintaining peace thereafter.
- Operation Veritable ended in Allied victory. The First Canadian Army captured the key town of Kleve in the heart of the Siegfried Line.
- All 100 tons of the German gold reserve was transported from Berlin to a salt mine near Eisenach.
- German submarine U-869 was depth charged and sunk in the Atlantic Ocean by U.S. destroyer escorts Howard D. Crow and Koiner.
- Died: Al Dubin, 53, American lyricist

== February 12, 1945 (Monday) ==
- The Treaty of Varkiza was signed in which the Greek resistance agreed to disarm and relinquish control of all the territory it occupied in exchange for legal recognition, free elections, and the removal of Nazi collaborators from the armed forces and police.
- Achille Van Acker became Prime Minister of Belgium.
- A devastating tornado outbreak in Mississippi and Alabama kills 45 people and injures 427 others.
- Peru declared war on Germany and Japan.
- Born:
  - David D. Friedman, economist, in New York City
  - Maud Adams, actress, in Luleå, Sweden
  - Roman Tam, renowned Hong Kong singer nicknamed "Godfather of Cantopop", in Guiping, China (d. 2002)
- Died: Antonio Villa-Real, 65, Filipino jurist and Associate Justice of the Supreme Court (executed by the Japanese)

== February 13, 1945 (Tuesday) ==
- The bombing of Dresden begins. Over the next three days a total of 3,900 tons of high-explosive bombs and incendiary devices were dropped on the city by Allied air forces.
- The Budapest Offensive and the Siege of Budapest ended with Nazi troops surrendering the Hungarian city to Soviet-Romanian forces.
- The Siege of Breslau began when Soviet troops encircled the city.
- The premiere of Sergei Prokofiev's Symphony No. 5 under the composer's baton at the Moscow Conservatory was delayed by a military salute marking the Red Army's crossing of the Vistula.
- Born: Vinod Mehra, actor, in Amritsar, Punjab, British India (d. 1990); Simon Schama, historian, in Marylebone, London, England

== February 14, 1945 (Wednesday) ==
- U.S. Army Air Forces carried out the Bombing of Prague. 701 people were killed, and about 100 houses and historical sites were destroyed in what was attributed to a navigation mistake.
- Red Army forces liberated the Gross-Rosen concentration camp.
- German submarine U-989 was depth charged and sunk in the North Atlantic by British warships.
- President Franklin D. Roosevelt meets King Ibn Saud of Saudi Arabia aboard USS Quincy, officially beginning U.S.-Saudi diplomatic relations.
- Born: Hans-Adam II, Prince of Liechtenstein, in Zürich, Switzerland

== February 15, 1945 (Thursday) ==
- Germans begin Operation Solstice on the Eastern Front.
- The Mostar operation ended in victory for the Yugloslav Partisans.
- Born: Douglas Hofstadter, professor of cognitive science, in New York City
- Died: Elmer Charles Bigelow, 24, U.S. Navy sailor and posthumous recipient of the Medal of Honor (died of smoke inhalation from fighting a fire aboard the destroyer USS Fletcher); Helmut Möckel, 35, German Hitler Youth leader (car accident)

== February 16, 1945 (Friday) ==
- The Soviet 1st Ukrainian Front captured Żagań.
- The U.S. Navy launched its first carrier raid against the Tokyo area.
- German submarine U-309 was depth charged and sunk in the North Sea by Canadian frigate HMCS Saint John.
- Born: Jeremy Bulloch, actor, in Market Harborough, England (d. 2020)

== February 17, 1945 (Saturday) ==
- The British Special Air Service executed Operation Cold Comfort, a raid that began with a parachute drop north of Verona, Italy with the objective of blocking the main rail lines through the Brenner Pass by landslide. The operation would ultimately fail.
- German scientists evacuated the Peenemünde Army Research Center.
- German submarine U-425 was depth charged and sunk by British warships near Murmansk.
- "Rum and Coca-Cola" by The Andrews Sisters hit #1 the Billboard Best Sellers in Stores record chart.
- Born: Brenda Fricker, actress, in Dublin, Ireland
- Died: Gabrielle Weidner, 30, Dutch resistance fighter (died in Königsberg / Neumark concentration camp)

== February 18, 1945 (Sunday) ==
- Operation Solstice ended in German failure.
- American forces breached the Siegfried Line north of Echternach.
- American destroyer USS Gamble was bombed and severely damaged by the Japanese off Iwo Jima. She was towed to Saipan but was never returned to service.
- Died: Dmitry Karbyshev, 64, Russian general (made to freeze to death in Mauthausen-Gusen concentration camp by the Nazis)

== February 19, 1945 (Monday) ==
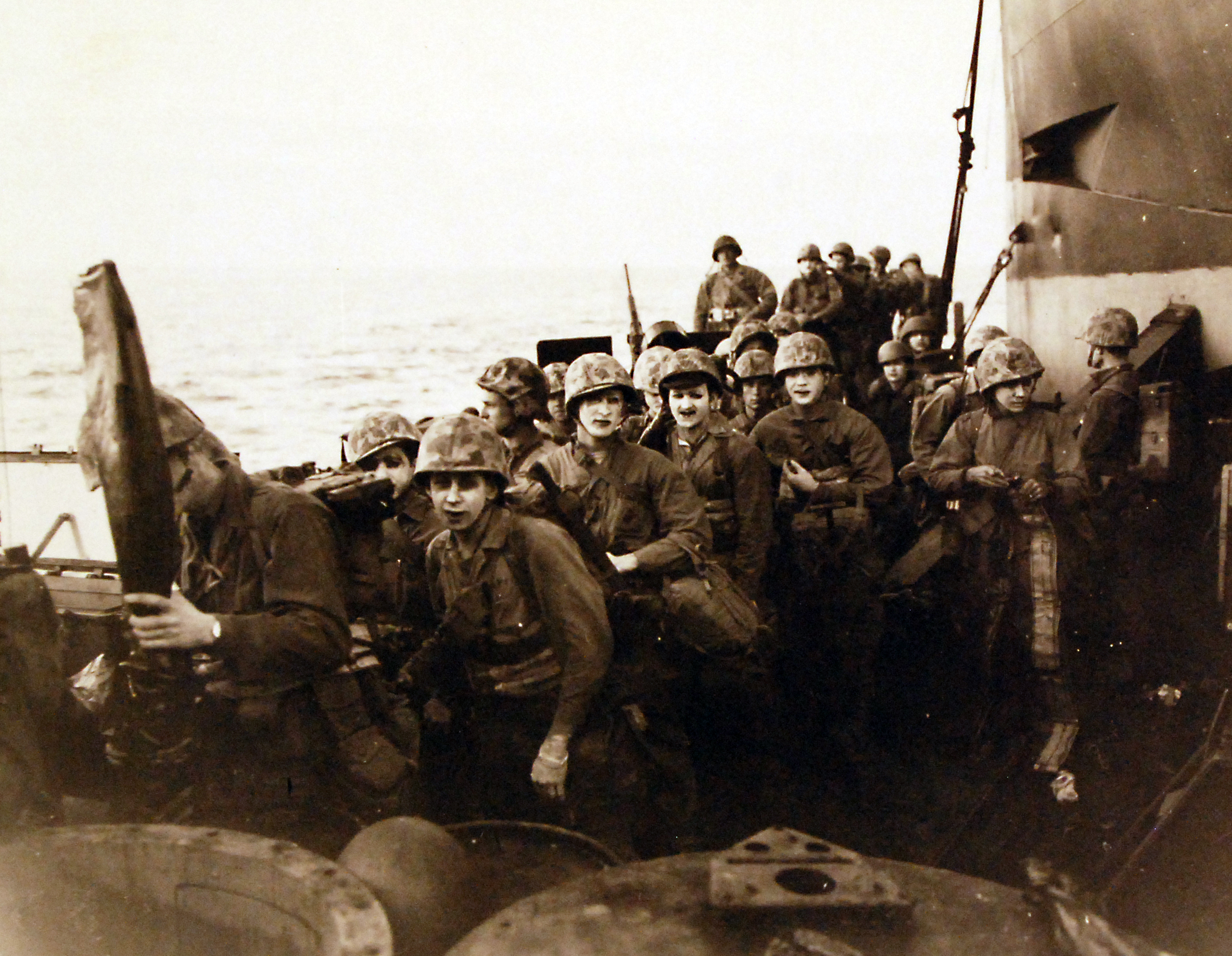
U.S. forces arrive on Iwo Jima

- The Battle of Iwo Jima began when American troops under Admiral Raymond A. Spruance landed on the island of Iwo Jima.
- Died: John Basilone, 28, U.S. Marine and Medal of Honor recipient (killed in the Battle of Iwo Jima), Darrell S. Cole, 24, U.S. Marine and posthumous Medal of Honor recipient (killed in the Battle of Iwo Jima)

== February 20, 1945 (Tuesday) ==
- Japanese destroyer Nokaze was torpedoed and sunk north of Nha Trang by the submarine USS Pargo with the loss of 209 lives.
- In the Atlantic Ocean, German submarine U-1276 sank the British corvette HMS Vervain and was then sunk in turn by Royal Navy sloop HMS Amethyst from the same convoy.
- Born: Henry Polic II, actor, in Pittsburgh, Pennsylvania (d. 2013); George Smoot, astrophysicist, cosmologist and Nobel laureate, in Yukon, Florida (d. 2025)

== February 21, 1945 (Wednesday) ==
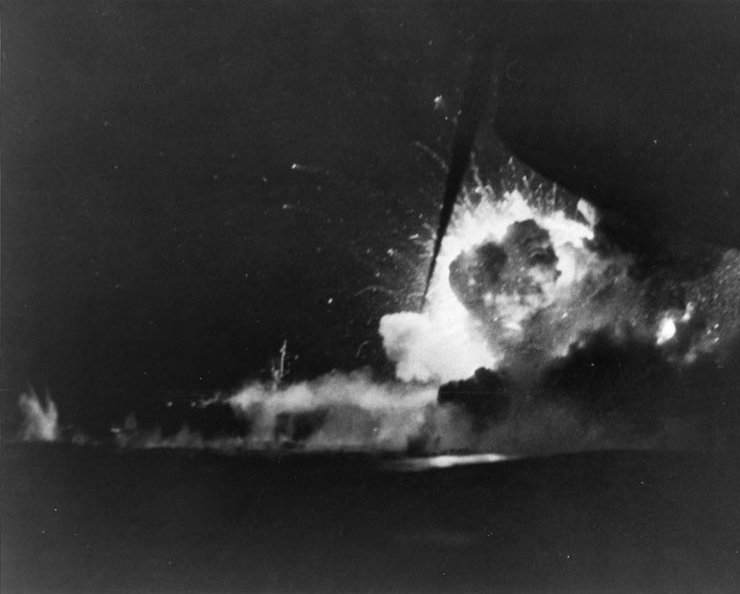
USS Bismarck Sea exploding after kamikaze hit

- The American escort carrier USS Bismarck Sea (CVE-95) was sunk by kamikazes during the Battle of Iwo Jima.
- The Battle of Baguio began in the Philippines.
- The war film God Is My Co-Pilot, starring Dennis Morgan and based on the 1943 autobiography of the same name by Robert Lee Scott, Jr., had its world premiere in Scott's hometown of Macon, Georgia. The day had been proclaimed "Robert Lee Scott-God Is My Co-Pilot Day" throughout the state of Georgia, and a special War Bond rally was held in conjunction with the premiere.
- Died: Eric Liddell, 43, Scottish athlete and missionary (brain tumour)

== February 22, 1945 (Thursday) ==
- The Battle of Ramree Island off Burma ended in Allied victory.
- German submarine U-300 was depth charged and sunk off Cádiz, Spain by British warships.
- Born: Peter Musñgi, voice-over artist, in Santiago, Isabela, Philippines
- Died: Jacques Doriot, 46, French fascist leader (killed by an Allied air attack in Germany)

== February 23, 1945 (Friday) ==
- The famous photograph Raising the Flag on Iwo Jima was taken by Joe Rosenthal of five U.S. Marines and a hospital corpsman raising a U.S. flag atop Mount Suribachi.
- The Battle of Poznań ended in Soviet victory.
- Turkey declared war on Germany and Japan.

== February 24, 1945 (Saturday) ==
- The Lower Silesian Offensive ended in Soviet victory.
- German submarine U-713 was depth charged and sunk in the Arctic Sea by British destroyer leader HMS Keppel.
- German submarine U-1208 was depth charged and sunk in the English Channel by Royal Navy frigates Duckworth and Rowley.
- Born: Barry Bostwick, actor, in San Mateo, California
- Died: Ahmad Mahir Pasha, 56 or 57, Prime Minister of Egypt (assassinated in parliament immediately after announcing the Egyptian declaration of war on Germany)

== February 25, 1945 (Sunday) ==
- American forces captured Düren.
- Radio Canada International was launched.
- Born: Elkie Brooks, singer, in Broughton, Salford, England
- Died: Mário de Andrade, 51, Brazilian poet, novelist, musicologist and critic (heart attack)

== February 26, 1945 (Monday) ==
- Syria declared war on Germany and Japan.
- Fighting ended on Corregidor. More than 5,000 Japanese had been killed, including some trapped in collapsed tunnels all over the island.
- In the United States, a midnight curfew on bars, nightclubs and all other places of entertainment went into effect nationwide in order to save coal.
- Born: Marta Kristen, actress, in Oslo, Norway; Roy Saari, Olympic gold medalist swimmer, in Buffalo, New York (d. 2008)
- Died: James Roy Andersen, 40, and Millard Harmon, 57, United States Army Air Force officers (plane disappearance in the Pacific)

== February 27, 1945 (Tuesday) ==
- Lebanon declared war on Germany and Japan.
- Civil administration of the Philippines was formally handed over to President Sergio Osmeña.
- German submarines U-327 and U-1018 were both depth charged and sunk in the Western Approaches by British warships.
- Born: Carl Anderson, singer and actor, in Lynchburg, Virginia (d. 2004)
- Died: Ross F. Gray, 24, U.S. Marine and posthumous recipient of the Medal of Honor (killed in action on Iwo Jima); William G. Walsh, 22, U.S. Marine and posthumous recipient of the Medal of Honor (threw himself on a hand grenade to save the lives of his fellow Marines during the Battle of Iwo Jima)

== February 28, 1945 (Wednesday) ==
- Saudi Arabia declared war on Germany and Japan.
- The Soviet 19th Army captured Neustettin.
- The U.S. Third Army captured Bitburg.
- Conservative MP Maurice Petherick introduced a motion in the House of Commons expressing regret that the agreement at Yalta did not allow Poland to decide its own future. The motion was defeated, 396–25.
- The drama film A Tree Grows in Brooklyn, starring Dorothy McGuire, Peggy Ann Garner, Joan Blondell and James Dunn and marking the directorial debut of Elia Kazan, premiered in New York City.
- Born:
  - Alexey Ekimov, Russian-born chemist, recipient of the 2023 Nobel Prize in Chemistry, in Leningrad, Soviet Union
  - Bubba Smith, NFL football player and actor, in Orange, Texas (d. 2011)
- Died: John Harlan Willis, 23, U.S. Navy hospital corpsman and posthumous recipient of the Medal of Honor (killed in action on Iwo Jima)
