= Operation Opossum =

Allied World War II special operation in Borneo

Coordinates: 0°47′N 127°22′E

- Part of the Japanese occupation of British Borneo during World War II
Date	9–11 April 1945
Location	Ternate Island
Result	Allied victory

Belligerents
Empire of Japan	Australia; Sultanate of Ternate

Commanders and leaders
	George Bosworth; Dick Perry; Sultan Muhammad Jabir Syah

Units involved
	Z Special Unit

Strength
Unknown	13 men

Casualties and losses
All	1 killed

Operation Opossum was a World War II raid undertaken by Australia's Z Special Unit in 1945 on the island of Ternate in North Maluku to rescue the Sultan of Ternate, Muhammad Jabir Syah.

== Operation ==
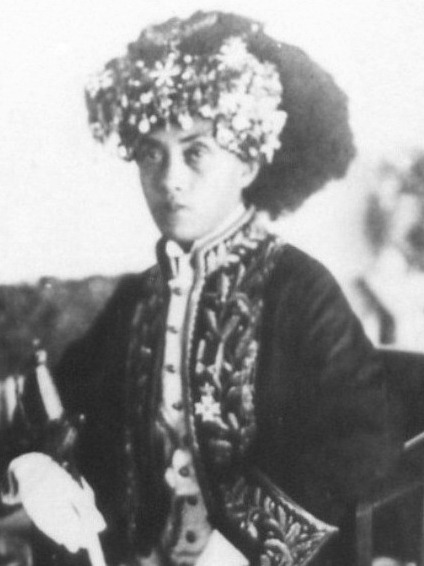
Sultan Muhammad Jabir Shah in 1930

The island of Ternate had been occupied by Japan since 1942. The Sultan sent several islanders to Australian Army headquarters on Morotai Island asking to be rescued. The Dutch were enthusiastic about the mission.

The mission had been requested by the Netherlands Indies Civil Administration who was, according to Dick Horton "embarrassed that the Sultan...had been captured by the Japanese ... and was being held hostage in his own castle". The mission was authorised by General Douglas MacArthur who was worried about the Sultan's life and his wives. The Sultan had been sympathetic to the Allied cause.

The Allied contingent consisted of eight Australians from Z Special Unit, and three Dutch officers and a Timorese corporal. The mission left Morotai on 8 April 1945 aboard two Australian crewed US Navy patrol boats and landed on the northern coast of Hiri Island, two kilometres north of Ternate. They went to the coastal village of Kulaba after a six-hour trek. Members of the unit rescued the Sultan along with his two wives, eight children and retinue of courtiers and relatives.

Several boatloads of Japanese soldiers arrived the next day, resulting in a shooting fight which resulted in the death of three Japanese and Australian officer Lieutenant George Bosworth. Warrant Officer Dick Perry assumed command and attacked the remaining Japanese, who were all killed.

The sultan and his family were taken to Morotai by PT boat where the Sultan spoke with MacArthur. They were then settled in the Queensland town of Wacol until the end of the war.

== Legacy ==
The mission reportedly inspired the film Attack Force Z (1981), even though the plot of that movie was very different from the facts of Opossum.

== External ==
- Operation Opossum at Z Special Unit
- "The Official History of the Operations and Administration of] Special Operations - Australia [(SOA), also known as the Inter-Allied Services Department (ISD) and Services Reconnaissance Department (SRD)] Volume 2 - Part IV". National Archives of Australia. p. 15.
