= German submarine U-518 =

German World War II submarine

Coordinates: 43°26′N 38°23′W

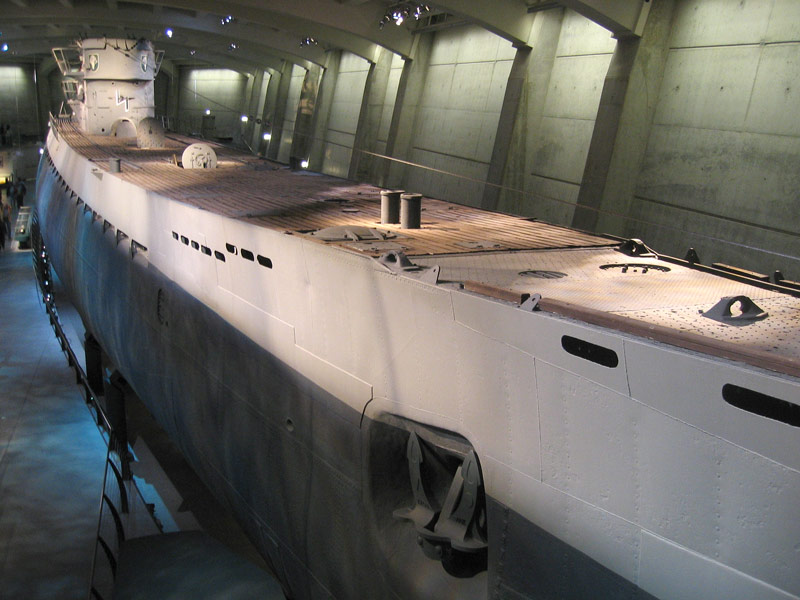
- U-505, a typical Type IXC boat

History

Nazi Germany
- Name: U-518
- Ordered: 14 February 1940
- Builder: Deutsche Werft, Hamburg
- Yard number: 314
- Laid down: 12 June 1941
- Launched: 11 February 1942
- Commissioned: 25 April 1942
- Fate: Sunk on 22nd of April 1945

General characteristics
- Class & type: Type IXC submarine
- Displacement: 1,120 t (1,100 long tons) surfaced; 1,232 t (1,213 long tons) submerged
- Length: 76.76 m (251 ft 10 in) o/a; 58.75 m (192 ft 9 in) pressure hull
- Beam: 6.76 m (22 ft 2 in) o/a; 4.40 m (14 ft 5 in) pressure hull
- Height: 9.60 m (31 ft 6 in)
- Draught: 4.70 m (15 ft 5 in)
- Installed power: 4,400 PS (3,200 kW; 4,300 bhp) (diesels); 1,000 PS (740 kW; 990 shp) (electric)
- Propulsion: 2 shafts; 2 × diesel engines; 2 × electric motors
- Speed: 18.3 knots (33.9 km/h; 21.1 mph) surfaced; 7.3 knots (13.5 km/h; 8.4 mph) submerged
- Range: 13,450 nmi (24,910 km; 15,480 mi) at 10 knots (19 km/h; 12 mph) surfaced; 64 nmi (119 km; 74 mi) at 4 knots (7.4 km/h; 4.6 mph) submerged
- Test depth: 230 m (750 ft)
- Complement: 4 officers, 44 enlisted
- Armament: 6 × torpedo tubes (4 bow, 2 stern); 22 × 53.3 cm (21 in) torpedoes; 1 × 10.5 cm (4.1 in) SK C/32 deck gun (180 rounds); 1 × 3.7 cm (1.5 in) SK C/30 AA gun; 1 × twin 2 cm FlaK 30 AA guns

Service record
- Part of: 4th U-boat Flotilla; 25 April – 30 September 1942; 2nd U-boat Flotilla; 1 October 1942 – 31 October 1944; 33rd U-boat Flotilla; 1 November 1944 – 22 April 1945
- Identification codes: M 44 690
- Commanders: F.Kapt. Hans-Günther Brachmann; 25 April – 18 August 1942; Kptlt. Friedrich-Wilhelm Wissmann; 19 August 1942 – 13 January 1944; Oblt.z.S. Hans-Werner Offermann; 13 January 1944 – 22 April 1945
- Operations: 7 patrols: 1st patrol: 26 September – 15 December 1942; 2nd patrol: 11 January – 27 April 1943; 3rd patrol: 24 June – 3 July 1943; 4th patrol: 18 August – 1 December 1943; 5th patrol: a. 23 January – 7 May 1944; b. 4 – 10 July 1944; 6th patrol: a. 15 July – 24 October 1944; b. 25 – 28 October 1944; c. 5 – 10 March 1945; 7th patrol: 12 March – 22 April 1945
- Victories: 9 merchant ships sunk (55,747 GRT); 3 merchant ships damaged (22,616 GRT)

German submarine U-518 was a Type IXC U-boat of the Nazi Germany's Kriegsmarine during World War II. She saw considerable success from her launch on 11 February 1942 until 22 April 1945. The U-boat was laid down at the Deutsche Werft in Hamburg as yard number 314 on 12 June 1941, and commissioned on 25 April 1942 with Fregattenkapitän Hans-Günther Brachmann in command. He was replaced on 19 August 1942 by Kapitänleutnant Friedrich-Wilhelm Wissmann. She sank nine ships and damaged three more in seven active patrols. U-518 had a crew of 56, and was by then commanded by Oberleutnant zur See Hans-Werner Offermann from 13 January 1944.

== Design ==
German Type IXC submarines were slightly larger than the original Type IXBs. U-518 had a displacement of 1,120 tonnes (1,100 long tons) when at the surface and 1,232 tonnes (1,213 long tons) while submerged. The U-boat had a total length of 76.76 m (251 ft 10 in), a pressure hull length of 58.75 m (192 ft 9 in), a beam of 6.76 m (22 ft 2 in), a height of 9.60 m (31 ft 6 in), and a draught of 4.70 m (15 ft 5 in). The submarine was powered by two MAN M 9 V 40/46 supercharged four-stroke, nine-cylinder diesel engines producing a total of 4,400 metric horsepower (3,240 kW; 4,340 shp) for use while surfaced, two Siemens-Schuckert 2 GU 345/34 double-acting electric motors producing a total of 1,000 shaft horsepower (1,010 PS; 750 kW) for use while submerged. She had two shafts and two 1.92 m (6 ft) propellers. The boat was capable of operating at depths of up to 230 metres (750 ft).

The submarine had a maximum surface speed of 18.3 knots (33.9 km/h; 21.1 mph) and a maximum submerged speed of 7.3 knots (13.5 km/h; 8.4 mph). When submerged, the boat could operate for 63 nautical miles (117 km; 72 mi) at 4 knots (7.4 km/h; 4.6 mph); when surfaced, she could travel 13,450 nautical miles (24,910 km; 15,480 mi) at 10 knots (19 km/h; 12 mph). U-518 was fitted with six 53.3 cm (21 in) torpedo tubes (four fitted at the bow and two at the stern), 22 torpedoes, one 10.5 cm (4.13 in) SK C/32 naval gun, 180 rounds, and a 3.7 cm (1.5 in) SK C/30 as well as a 2 cm (0.79 in) C/30 anti-aircraft gun. The boat had a complement of forty-eight.

== Service history ==
=== First patrol ===
She left Kiel on 26 September 1942, by-passed the British Isles via the gap between Iceland and the Faeroe Islands and crossed the Atlantic. She entered Conception Bay, Newfoundland and near Bell Island sank the Free French PLM 27 and the Canadian Rose Castle on 2 November. A week later, on 9 November, she put a German spy named Werner von Janowski ashore at New Carlisle, Quebec.

Moving out into the Atlantic proper, she sank the British ship Empire Sailor and damaged two other ships on 21 November, finally sinking the American ship Caddo on 23 November before returning to her new home base, Lorient in occupied France, arriving on 15 December 1942.

=== Second patrol ===
Leaving Lorient on 11 January 1943, she sailed to the eastern Brazilian coast and on 14 February 1943 came under attack from unidentified Allied aircraft; she sustained minimal damage Between 18 February and 25 March, she sank another four ships. On the return journey, she passed through the Cape Verde Islands, west of the Canary Islands and east of the Azores, arriving back at Lorient on 27 April 1943 after a patrol lasting 107 days.

=== Third patrol ===
Her third sortie was marked by a depth charge and strafing attack on 27 June 1943 by a Sunderland flying boat of No. 201 Squadron RAF. The damage incurred was serious enough to warrant her return which was hampered by another attack by a Sunderland, this time from No. 10 Squadron RAAF on 30 June in the Bay of Biscay. This incident caused no further damage, but the aircraft's rear gunner was mortally wounded. The boat docked in Bordeaux on 3 July.

=== Fourth patrol ===
She spent fifteen weeks on patrol which included a presence in the Gulf of Mexico, between 18 August and 1 December 1943, with no results.

=== Fifth patrol ===
Another long patrol saw the boat in the Caribbean where she torpedoed the Panamanian Valera. The ship broke in two before sinking. The submarine had departed Lorient on 23 January 1944 and returned there on 10 July.

She was on non-active patrol afterwards. Traveling from port to port, lasting from 4 to 10 July 1944, with no results.

=== Sixth patrol ===
By now, the Allies were besieging the Atlantic ports on the landward side; the boat departed Lorient for the last time on 15 July 1944. Allied escort ships attacked a submarine in mid-ocean, probably U-518, on 9 August. She next turned up, on the eastern US coast, where she damaged the American George Ade. She then withdrew to Kristiansand in Norway, arriving on 24 October 1944.

She was on non-active patrol again afterwards. Both of these voyages from 25 to 28 October 1944 and 5 to 10 March 1945 were between ports and produced no results.

=== Seventh patrol and loss ===
Her last foray began when she departed Kristiansand on 12 March 1945. She was sunk northwest of the Azores on 22 April by hedgehog rounds from USS Carter and USS Neal A. Scott. There were no survivors.

=== Wolfpacks ===
U-518 took part in two wolfpacks, namely:

- Panther (7 – 11 October 1942)
- Seewolf (14 – 22 April 1945)

== Summary of raiding history ==
Date	Ship Name	Nationality	Tonnage (GRT)	Fate
2 November 1942	P.L.M. 27	Free France	5,633	Sunk
2 November 1942	Rose Castle	Canada	7,803	Sunk
21 November 1942	British Promise	United Kingdom	8,443	Damaged
21 November 1942	British Renown	United Kingdom	6,997	Damaged
21 November 1942	Empire Sailor	United Kingdom	6,140	Sunk
21 November 1942	Caddo	United States	10,172	Sunk
18 February 1943	Brasiloide	Brazil	6,075	Sunk
1 March 1943	Fitz-John Porter	United States	7,176	Sunk
20 March 1943	Mariso	Netherlands	7,659	Sunk
25 March 1943	Industria	Sweden	1,688	Sunk
7 March 1944	Valera	Panama	3,401	Sunk
12 September 1944	George Ade	United States	7,176	Damaged

== Bibliography ==
- Busch, Rainer; Röll, Hans-Joachim (1999). German U-boat commanders of World War II : a biographical dictionary. Translated by Brooks, Geoffrey. London, Annapolis, Md: Greenhill Books, Naval Institute Press. ISBN 1-55750-186-6.
- Busch, Rainer; Röll, Hans-Joachim (1999). Deutsche U-Boot-Verluste von September 1939 bis Mai 1945 [German U-boat losses from September 1939 to May 1945]. Der U-Boot-Krieg (in German). Vol. IV. Hamburg, Berlin, Bonn: Mittler. ISBN 3-8132-0514-2.
- Gröner, Erich; Jung, Dieter; Maass, Martin (1991). U-boats and Mine Warfare Vessels. German Warships 1815–1945. Vol. 2. Translated by Thomas, Keith; Magowan, Rachel. London: Conway Maritime Press. ISBN 0-85177-593-4.
- Kemp, Paul (1999). U-Boats Destroyed - German Submarine Losses in the World Wars. London: Arms & Armour. ISBN 1-85409-515-3.
