= German submarine U-326 =

German World War II submarine

History

Nazi Germany
- Name: U-326
- Ordered: 16 July 1942
- Builder: Flender Werke, Lübeck
- Yard number: 326
- Laid down: 26 April 1943
- Launched: 22 April 1944
- Commissioned: 6 June 1944
- Fate: Sunk by an American aircraft on 30 April 1945

General characteristics
- Class & type: Type VIIC/41 submarine
- Displacement: 759 tonnes (747 long tons) surfaced; 860 t (846 long tons) submerged
- Length: 67.23 m (220 ft 7 in) o/a; 50.50 m (165 ft 8 in) pressure hull
- Beam: 6.20 m (20 ft 4 in) o/a; 4.70 m (15 ft 5 in) pressure hull
- Height: 9.60 m (31 ft 6 in)
- Draught: 4.74 m (15 ft 7 in)
- Installed power: 2,800–3,200 PS (2,100–2,400 kW; 2,800–3,200 bhp) (diesels); 750 PS (550 kW; 740 shp) (electric)
- Propulsion: 2 shafts; 2 × diesel engines; 2 × electric motors
- Speed: 17.7 knots (32.8 km/h; 20.4 mph) surfaced; 7.6 knots (14.1 km/h; 8.7 mph) submerged
- Range: 8,500 nmi (15,700 km; 9,800 mi) at 10 knots (19 km/h; 12 mph) surfaced; 80 nmi (150 km; 92 mi) at 4 knots (7.4 km/h; 4.6 mph) submerged
- Test depth: 250 m (820 ft); Crush depth: 275–325 m (902–1,066 ft)
- Complement: 4 officers, 40–56 enlisted
- Armament: 5 × 53.3 cm (21 in) torpedo tubes (four bow, one stern); 14 × torpedoes; 1 × 8.8 cm (3.46 in) deck gun (220 rounds); 1 × 3.7 cm (1.5 in) Flak M42 AA gun; 2 × 2 cm (0.79 in) C/30 AA guns

Service record
- Part of: 4th U-boat Flotilla; 6 June 1944 – 28 February 1945; 11th U-boat Flotilla; 1 March – 30 April 1945
- Identification codes: M 14 594
- Commanders: Kptlt. Peter Matthes; 6 June 1944 – 30 April 1945
- Operations: 1 patrol: 28 March – 30 April 1945
- Victories: None

German submarine U-326 was a Type VIIC/41 U-boat of Nazi Germany's Kriegsmarine during World War II. While she carried out one patrol U-326 failed to sink or damage any ships. The boat was sunk on 30 April 1945 in the Bay of Biscay by an American aircraft.

== Design ==
German Type VIIC/41 submarines were preceded by the heavier Type VIIC submarines. U-326 had a displacement of 759 tonnes (747 long tons) when at the surface and 860 tonnes (850 long tons) while submerged. She had a total length of 67.10 m (220 ft 2 in), a pressure hull length of 50.50 m (165 ft 8 in), a beam of 6.20 m (20 ft 4 in), a height of 9.60 m (31 ft 6 in), and a draught of 4.74 m (15 ft 7 in). The submarine was powered by two Germaniawerft F46 four-stroke, six-cylinder supercharged diesel engines producing a total of 2,800 to 3,200 metric horsepower (2,060 to 2,350 kW; 2,760 to 3,160 shp) for use while surfaced, two Garbe, Lahmeyer & Co. RP 137/c double-acting electric motors producing a total of 750 metric horsepower (550 kW; 740 shp) for use while submerged. She had two shafts and two 1.23 m (4 ft) propellers. The boat was capable of operating at depths of up to 230 metres (750 ft).

The submarine had a maximum surface speed of 17.7 knots (32.8 km/h; 20.4 mph) and a maximum submerged speed of 7.6 knots (14.1 km/h; 8.7 mph). When submerged, the boat could operate for 80 nautical miles (150 km; 92 mi) at 4 knots (7.4 km/h; 4.6 mph); when surfaced, she could travel 8,500 nautical miles (15,700 km; 9,800 mi) at 10 knots (19 km/h; 12 mph). U-326 was fitted with five 53.3 cm (21 in) torpedo tubes (four fitted at the bow and one at the stern), fourteen torpedoes, one 8.8 cm (3.46 in) SK C/35 naval gun, (220 rounds), one 3.7 cm (1.5 in) Flak M42 and two 2 cm (0.79 in) C/30 anti-aircraft guns. The boat had a complement of between forty-four and sixty.

== Service history ==
The submarine was laid down on 26 April 1943 by the Flender Werke yard at Lübeck as yard number 326, launched on 22 April 1944 and commissioned on 6 June under the command of Kapitänleutnant Peter Matthes.

She served with the 4th U-boat Flotilla for training, from 6 June 1944 to 28 February 1945. She was then transferred to the 11th flotilla for operations on 1 March.

=== Patrol ===
Having carried out a series of short voyages between Kiel in Germany and Horten Naval Base, Stavanger and Bergen in Norway in February and March 1945, U-326 departed Bergen on 28 March and passing western Scotland and Ireland, entered the Bay of Biscay.

=== Fate ===
The boat was sunk by retro bombs dropped from a US Navy PBY Catalina of VP-63 west of Brest on 30 April 1945.

Forty-three men died; there were no survivors.

==== Previously recorded fate ====
U-326 was sunk on 25 April 1945 in the Bay of Biscay west of Brest by a homing torpedo from a B-24 Liberator of VP-103. This attack actually sunk the U-1107.

== See also ==
- Battle of the Atlantic (1939-1945)

== Bibliography ==
- Gröner, Erich; Jung, Dieter; Maass, Martin (1991). U-boats and Mine Warfare Vessels. German Warships 1815–1945. Vol. 2. Translated by Thomas, Keith; Magowan, Rachel. London: Conway Maritime Press. ISBN 0-85177-593-4.
- Busch, Rainer; Röll, Hans-Joachim (1999). German U-boat commanders of World War II : a biographical dictionary. Translated by Brooks, Geoffrey. London, Annapolis, Md: Greenhill Books, Naval Institute Press. ISBN 1-55750-186-6.
- Busch, Rainer; Röll, Hans-Joachim (1999). Der U-Boot-Krieg, 1939-1945: Deutsche U-Boot-Verluste von September 1939 bis Mai 1945 [German U-boat losses from September 1939 to May 1945] (in German). Vol. IV. Hamburg, Berlin, Bonn: Mittler. ISBN 3-8132-0514-2.
- Kemp, Paul (1999). U-Boats Destroyed - German Submarine Losses in the World Wars. London: Arms & Armour. ISBN 1-85409-515-3.
