= Miotero Geninetti =

Italian partisan and brigade commander

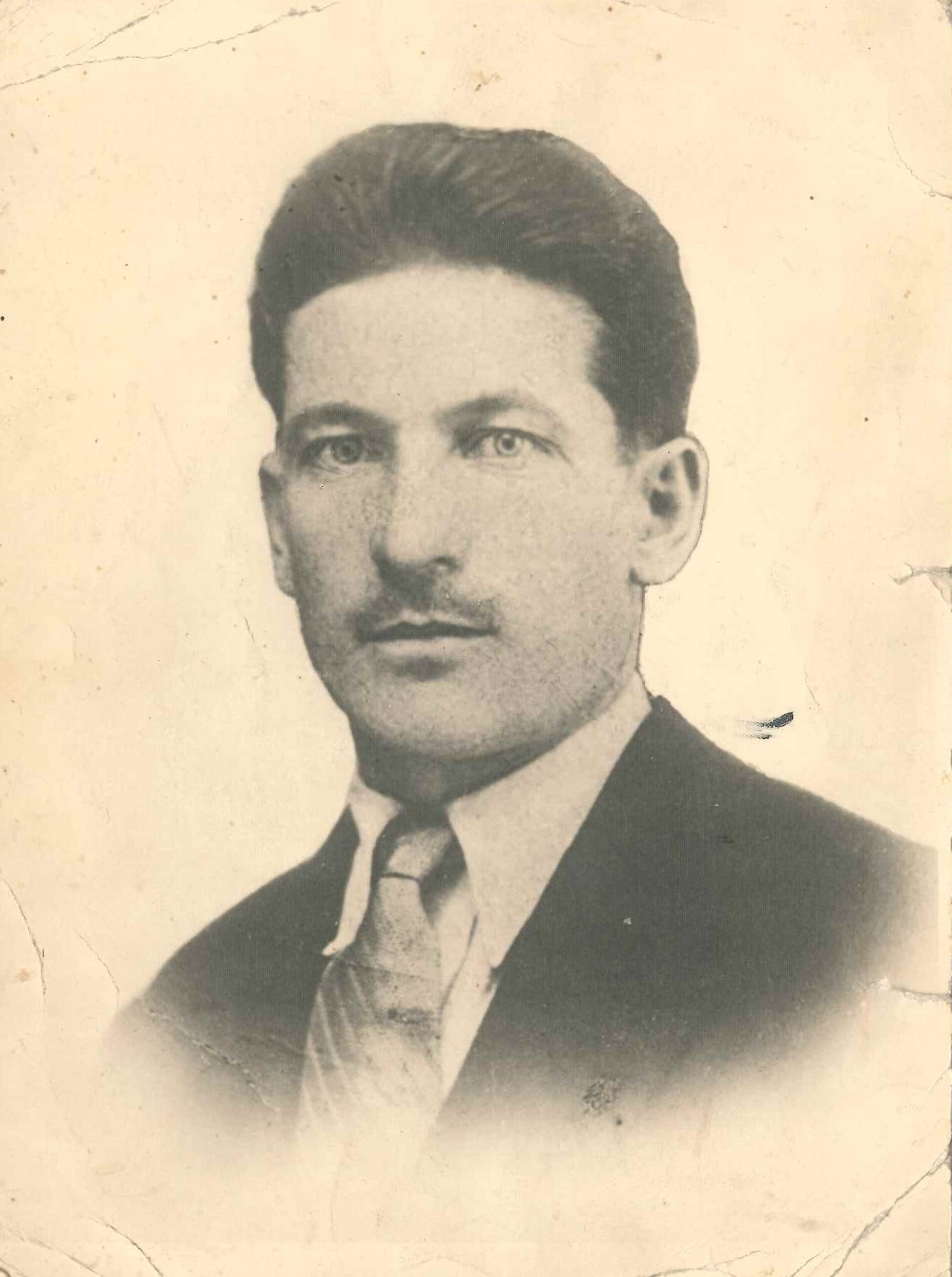
- Born: July 24, 1904; Grenoble
- Died: April 25, 1945 (aged 40); Mattie, Piedmont
- Occupation: Partisan

Miotero (known as Stefano) Geninetti (Grenoble, 24 July 1904 – Mattie, Piedmont, 25 April 1945) was an Italian partisan and brigade commander in the 43rd Autonomous Division "Sergio de Vitis".

== Biography ==
Prior to his activity in the Italian Resistance, Miotero was a worker married to Maria Morra, with whom he had two children: Maresa and Serafino, called "Sergi". He worked at the lace factory in Cascine Vica, in the Province of Turin, where ribbons, strings, curtains and a huge variety of lace were produced.

After the Badoglio Proclamation of 8 September 1943, announcing the Armistice of Cassibile between Italy and the Allies, Geninetti was contacted to go into the war industry in Germany. He firmly refused the proposal and was fired as a result. He then went into hiding by joining the Autonomous Division "Sergio de Vitis", of which he became brigade commander.

He was captured in Rivalta di Torino during a roundup and taken to Turin, where he was interrogated and tortured for a long time. On 25 April 1945, the day of the Liberation, he was shot in Mattie, Piedmont. When his children Maresa and Serafino, 12 and 10 years old respectively, learned of their father's death, they decided to go and look for his body. With difficulty they managed to reach Mattie, where they were shown to the place where Geninetti had been hastily buried with other partisans in a mass grave.

Geninetti then received a proper burial in the Cemetery of Rivalta di Torino, where the alley in which he lived has been named after him.

== Bibliography ==
- Gallo, Gino (2016). Rivalta e la Resistenza [Rivalry and the Resistance] (in Italian).
