= USS Carter =

Cannon-class destroyer escort

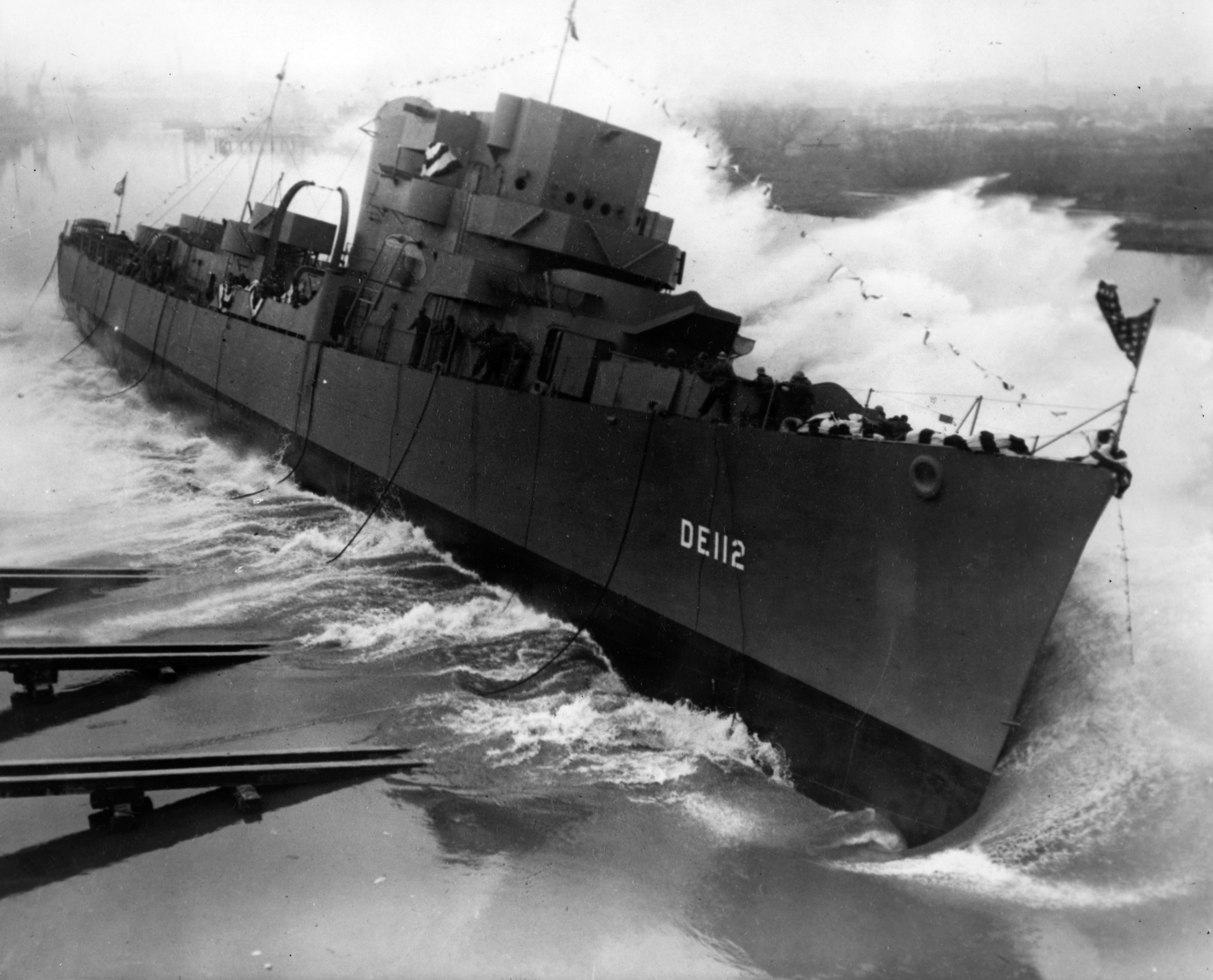

History

United States
- Name: USS Carter (DE-112)
- Namesake: Jack Carter
- Builder: Dravo Corporation, Wilmington, Delaware
- Laid down: 19 November 1943
- Launched: 29 February 1944
- Commissioned: 3 May 1944
- Decommissioned: 10 April 1946
- Stricken: 10 February 1949
- Honors and awards: 1 battle stars (World War II)
- Fate: Transferred to the Republic of China, 14 December 1948

History

Taiwan
- Name: ROCS Taizhao (太昭) (DE-26)
- Acquired: 14 December 1948
- Stricken: December 1973
- Fate: Scrapped

General characteristics
- Class & type: Cannon-class destroyer escort
- Displacement: 1,240 long tons (1,260 t) standard; 1,620 long tons (1,646 t) full
- Length: 306 ft (93 m) o/a; 300 ft (91 m) w/l
- Beam: 36 ft (11 m)
- Draft: 11 ft 8 in (3.56 m)
- Propulsion: 4 × GM Mod. 16-278A diesel engines with electric drive, 6,000 shp (4,474 kW), 2 screws
- Speed: 21 knots (39 km/h; 24 mph)
- Range: 10,800 nmi (20,000 km) at 12 kn (22 km/h; 14 mph)
- Complement: 15 officers and 201 enlisted
- Armament: 3 × Mk.22 3"/50 caliber guns; 8 × 20 mm Mk.4 AA guns; 3 × 21-inch (533 mm) torpedo tubes; 1 × Hedgehog Mk.10 anti-submarine mortar (144 rounds); 8 × Mk.6 depth charge projectors; 2 × Mk.9 depth charge tracks

USS Carter (DE-112) was a Cannon-class destroyer escort in service with the United States Navy from 1944 to 1946. In 1948, she was sold to Taiwan where she served as Taizhao. She was scrapped in 1974.

== History ==
=== U.S. Navy (1944–1948) ===
Carter was launched on 29 February 1944 by the Dravo Corporation, Wilmington, Delaware; sponsored by Mrs. E. C. Patterson; commissioned on 3 May 1944 and reported to the Atlantic Fleet.

Carter sailed from New York on 21 July 1944 escorting a convoy bound for Bizerte, Tunisia, from which she returned to New York 18 September. Training at Casco Bay, a run to Jamaica to join French transport Cuba whom she guarded to New York, and a period training pre-commissioning crews for other escort vessels preceded her next convoy assignment. This crossing took her to Oran, from which she returned to Boston, Massachusetts, on 20 January 1945.

Anti-submarine patrol from Casco Bay was Carter's assignment for the remainder of the war. Her constant vigilance was rewarded on 22 April, when she picked up U-518 as a sound contact. In mountainous seas, she and USS Neal A. Scott (DE-769) joined in a hedgehog attack which sank the U-boat in 43°26' N., 38°23' W. On 9 May she made rendezvous at sea with U-858 whom she escorted to the designated surrender area. After her group captured U-284 attempting an escape to Japan with a German major general, Japanese officials, and important cargo on board, Carter brought the captive in to Portsmouth, New Hampshire, on 17 May.

At New York City from 20 May to 10 June 1945, Carter next sailed to act as plane guard during carrier qualification flights off Florida. She arrived at Green Cove Springs, Florida on 8 November 1945, and was placed out of commission in reserve there on 10 April 1946.

=== Republic of China Navy (1948–1973) ===
On 14 December 1948, she was transferred to Nationalist China, with whom she served as Taizhao (太昭) (DE-26). When China was taken over by the Communists, Taizhao escaped with Nationalist Forces to Taiwan in 1949. On 13 February 1951, She joined the blockade fleet under the direct order of ROC President Chiang Kai-shek to capture and confiscate the Norwegian civilian freighter Hoi Houw at 24°13′00″N 123°18′00″E within the Japanese territory of Yaeyama Islands in the west Pacific Ocean. She was stricken from the Navy List in December 1973, and scrapped.

== Awards ==
Carter received one battle star for World War II service.
