= USS Neal A. Scott =

Cannon-class destroyer escort

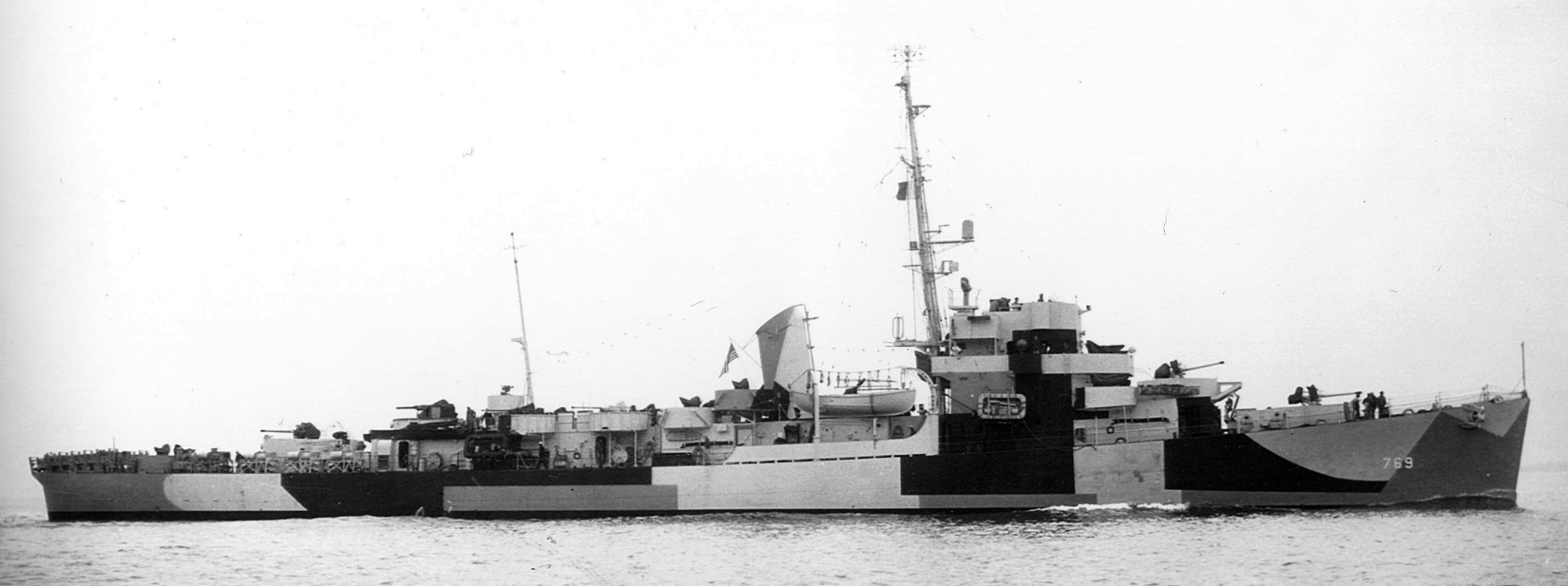

History

United States
- Name: USS Neal A. Scott
- Namesake: Neal Anderson Scott
- Builder: Tampa Shipbuilding Company, Tampa, Florida
- Laid down: 1 June 1943
- Launched: 4 June 1944
- Commissioned: 31 July 1944
- Decommissioned: 30 April 1946
- Stricken: 1 June 1968
- Honors and awards: 1 battle star (World War II)
- Fate: Sold for scrap, July 1969

General characteristics
- Class & type: Cannon-class destroyer escort
- Displacement: 1,240 long tons (1,260 t) standard; 1,620 long tons (1,646 t) full
- Length: 306 ft (93 m) o/a; 300 ft (91 m) w/l
- Beam: 36 ft 10 in (11.23 m)
- Draft: 11 ft 8 in (3.56 m)
- Propulsion: 4 × GM Mod. 16-278A diesel engines with electric drive, 6,000 shp (4,474 kW), 2 screws
- Speed: 21 knots (39 km/h; 24 mph)
- Range: 10,800 nmi (20,000 km) at 12 kn (22 km/h; 14 mph)
- Complement: 15 officers and 201 enlisted
- Armament: 3 × single Mk.22 3"/50 caliber guns; 1 × twin 40 mm Mk.1 AA gun; 8 × 20 mm Mk.4 AA guns; 3 × 21-inch (533 mm) torpedo tubes; 1 × Hedgehog Mk.10 anti-submarine mortar (144 rounds); 8 × Mk.6 depth charge projectors; 2 × Mk.9 depth charge tracks

USS Neal A. Scott (DE-769) was a Cannon-class destroyer escort in service with the United States Navy from 1944 to 1946. She was sold for scrapping in 1969.

== Namesake ==
Neal Anderson Scott was born on 21 May 1919 in Montgomery, Alabama. Scott was appointed assistant paymaster with the rank of ensign, U.S. Naval Reserve on 8 April 1942. After instruction at the Navy Supply Corps School, Harvard University Graduate School of Business Administration, Boston, Massachusetts, he was ordered to the 12th Naval District for further assignment. On 10 October 1942, he reported for duty aboard USS Smith, then operating in the Solomon Islands.

On 26 October, as the Battle of the Santa Cruz Islands raged, USS Smith, assigned to screen the USS Enterprise, was hit by a Japanese torpedo plane causing the entire forward topside to erupt in flames. Scott, mortally wounded, "... exhorted the gun crews to sustain heavy and accurate fire against the enemy ..." in defense of the Enterprise. He was posthumously awarded the Navy Cross.

== History ==
Neal A. Scott was laid down on 1 June 1943 by the Tampa Shipbuilding Company, Tampa, Florida; launched on 4 June 1944, co-sponsored by Mrs. Leigh Scott and Miss Margaret Scott, mother and sister, respectively, of Ensign Scott; and commissioned on 31 July 1944.

=== Battle of the Atlantic ===
Following shakedown off Bermuda and availability at Boston, Massachusetts, Neal A. Scott steamed to Norfolk, Virginia, thence to Solomons Island, Maryland, where she conducted acoustic test runs for the Naval Mine Warfare Test Station during the first two weeks of November 1944. She then proceeded back to Norfolk whence she operated as a training ship in the lower Chesapeake Bay area until 10 December. The next day she sortied from Lynnhaven Roads in Task Force 63 to escort convoy UGS-63 to Oran, Algeria. The convoy of approximately 100 ships in 15 columns passed through the Strait of Gibraltar on 27 December and arrived at Oran the 28th.

On 2 January 1945, Neal A. Scott departed North Africa on her return voyage, escorting convoy GUS-63 to Hampton Roads. On the 3rd, at 1707, a large cloud of smoke was seen and an explosion heard from the center of the first line of the convoy. Neal A. Scott immediately started a submarine search on the starboard bow of the convoy. At 1739 good sonar contact was established and a depth charge attack begun. In the next six minutes 26 charges were dropped. Thirty seconds after the last charge detonated, the rumble of an underwater explosion, followed by the appearance of an oil slick off the escort's port quarter, was reported and sonar contact was lost. At 1755 contact was regained and a hedgehog attack was made. Two to four explosions were heard within the next half-minute, and eight more were heard over a minute later, but, again, contact was lost. Contact established again at 1806, a second hedgehog run was made. This time, however, no explosions were reported and the contact was lost. Undiscouraged, the ship continued her search until relieved by British escorts at 2345. Neal A. Scott then returned to the convoy and arrived at Norfolk without further incident on 19 January.

In February, Neal A. Scott joined the Southern Forces Barrier Patrol in the North Atlantic and for the remainder of the war in Europe conducted submarine searches off the coasts of Maine, Nova Scotia and Newfoundland as part of "Operation Teardrop". On 22 April, as she steamed in a scouting line proceeding to Argentia, Newfoundland, a submarine contact was made by another escort, the destroyer USS Carter. Sixteen minutes later, at 0056, Neal A. Scott made a hedgehog attack. Several explosions were reported. At 0108, Carter delivered a similar attack which was followed immediately by two or three detonations and then by an explosion. At 0118, another, and heavier, explosion was felt and heard by all hands. The U-518 had been sent to the bottom of the North Atlantic.

After the surrender of Germany on 7 May, Neal A. Scott was ordered to intercept U-1228 and bring her into port. While proceeding to the surrender point, U-858 was contacted and ordered to the surrender point. On 11 May, U-1228 was intercepted and after sending a boarding party to the submarine and taking on 28 of the U-boat's crew, including the Captain, the escort headed for Portsmouth, New Hampshire, where she turned over her prisoners and their boat to U.S. Coast Guard officials on 17 May.

=== Post-War and fate ===
Neal A. Scott then steamed south to Bayonne, New Jersey, for availability, after which she proceeded to Florida. On 13 June she joined the Carrier Qualification Detachment at Jacksonville, Florida, and for the next two months operated as plane guard for Guadalcanal (CVE-60). Detached from the Carrier Qualification Detachment, Neal A. Scott underwent availability at Charleston, South Carolina, and then headed for Corpus Christi, Texas, for Navy Day celebrations. She returned to Charleston on 4 November, only to depart again on the 7th.

From Charleston she steamed back to Jacksonville where she decommissioned on 30 April 1946 and entered the Atlantic Reserve Fleet, berthed at Green Cove Springs, Florida. In 1961 the escort was transferred to the Orange, Texas, berthing area where she remained until struck from the Navy Register on 1 June 1968. She was sold July 1969 and broken up for scrap.

== Awards ==
Neal A. Scott received one battle star for her World War II service.
