= Cirkliškis Manor =

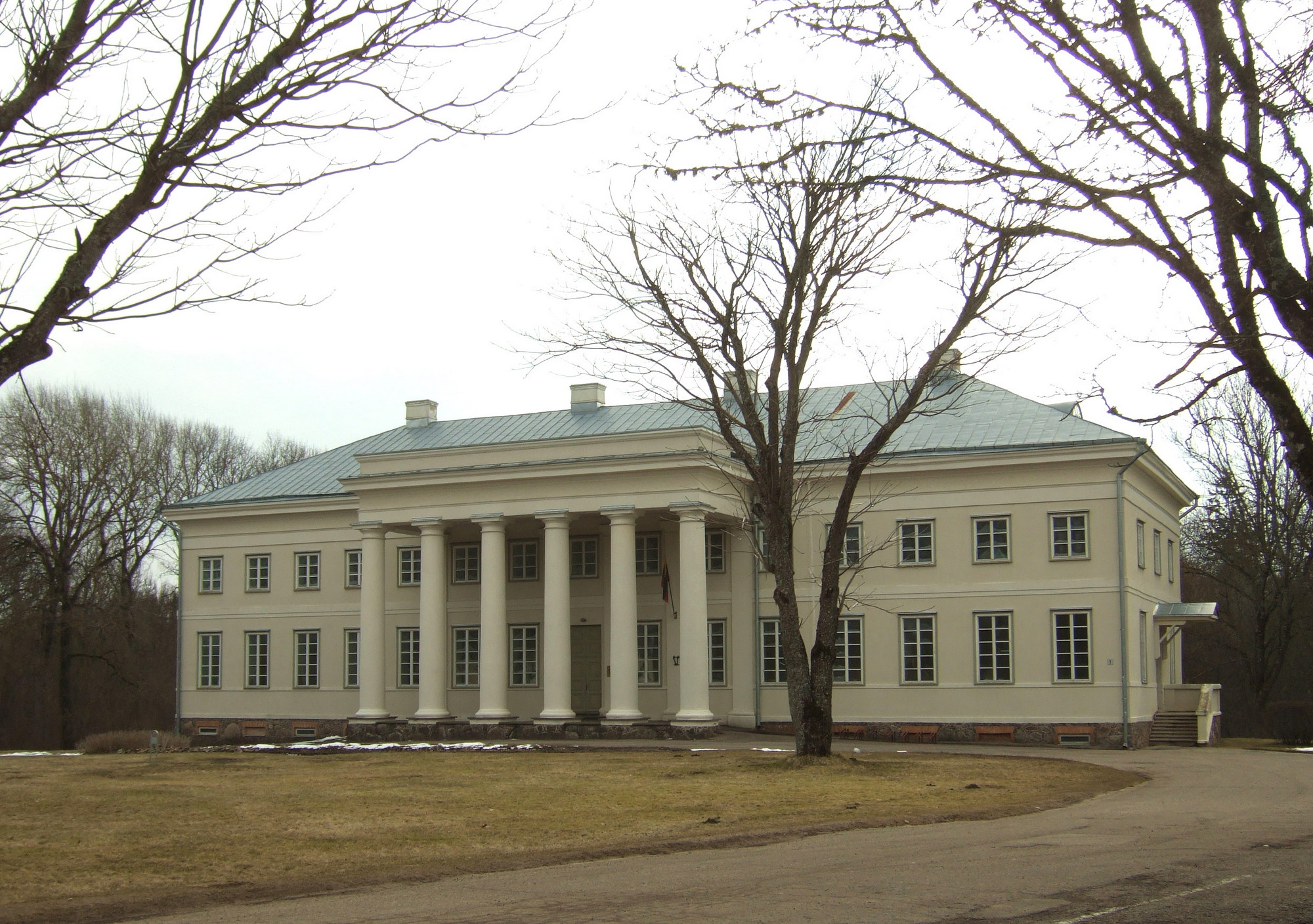
- Interactive map of the Cirkliškis Manor area

General information
- Type: Manor
- Architectural style: Classicism
- Location: Cirkliškis, Lithuania
- Coordinates: 55°7′7″N 26°8′19″E

Cirkliškis Manor is a former residential manor in Cirkliškis, 3 km (1.9 mi) southwest from Švenčionys. Main manor building is built in classicism style, has two floors, main facade consists of 6 columns portico. Smithy, icehouse and 35 hectares park have also remained until nowadays.
