= German submarine U-78 (1940) =

German World War II submarine

History

Nazi Germany
- Name: U-78
- Ordered: 25 January 1939
- Builder: Bremer Vulkan, Bremen-Vegesack
- Yard number: 6
- Laid down: 28 March 1940
- Launched: 7 December 1940
- Commissioned: 15 February 1941
- Fate: Sunk on 16 April 1945 by Soviet artillery fire.

General characteristics
- Class & type: Type VIIC submarine
- Displacement: 769 tonnes (757 long tons) surfaced; 871 t (857 long tons) submerged
- Length: 67.10 m (220 ft 2 in) o/a; 50.50 m (165 ft 8 in) pressure hull
- Beam: 6.20 m (20 ft 4 in) o/a; 4.70 m (15 ft 5 in) pressure hull
- Height: 9.60 m (31 ft 6 in)
- Draught: 4.74 m (15 ft 7 in)
- Installed power: 2,800–3,200 PS (2,100–2,400 kW; 2,800–3,200 bhp) (diesels); 750 PS (550 kW; 740 shp) (electric)
- Propulsion: 2 shafts; 2 × diesel engines; 2 × electric motors
- Speed: 17.7 knots (32.8 km/h; 20.4 mph) surfaced; 7.6 knots (14.1 km/h; 8.7 mph) submerged
- Range: 8,500 nmi (15,700 km; 9,800 mi) at 10 knots (19 km/h; 12 mph) surfaced; 80 nmi (150 km; 92 mi) at 4 knots (7.4 km/h; 4.6 mph) submerged
- Test depth: 230 m (750 ft); Crush depth: 250–295 m (820–968 ft)
- Complement: 4 officers, 40–56 enlisted
- Armament: 2 × 53.3 cm (21 in) torpedo tubes (bow); 14 × torpedoes or 26 TMA mines; 1 × 8.8 cm (3.46 in) deck gun (220 rounds); 1 x 2 cm (0.79 in) C/30 AA gun

Service record
- Part of: 22nd U-boat Flotilla; 15 February 1941 – 28 February 1945; 4th U-boat Flotilla; 1 March – 16 April 1945
- Identification codes: M 29 850
- Commanders: Kptlt. Adolf Dumrese; 15 February – July 1941; Oblt.z.S. Kurt Makowski; July 1941 – February 1942; Oblt.z.S. / Kptlt. Max Bernd Dieterich; February – 30 June 1942; Kptlt. Ernst Ziehm; 1 July – November 1942; Kptlt. Helmut Sommer; November 1942 – 16 May 1943; Oblt.z.S. Wilhelm Eisele; 17 May 1943 – 26 November 1944; Oblt.z.S. Horst Hübsch; 27 November 1944 – 16 April 1945
- Operations: None
- Victories: None

German submarine U-78 was a Type VIIC submarine of Nazi Germany's Kriegsmarine during World War II. She was the only German submarine to be sunk by land-based artillery fire during the war. Built by Bremen-Vegesack.

She was ordered on 25 January 1939, and laid down on 28 March 1940, in the shipyard of Bremer Vulkan in the port city of Bremen-Vegesack as yard number 6. U-78 was launched on 7 December 1940 and formally commissioned into the Kriegsmarine as a "school boat" on 15 February 1941, with a crew of 41 under the command of Kapitänleutnant Alfred Dumrese.

== Design ==
German Type VIIC submarines were preceded by the shorter Type VIIB submarines. U-78 had a displacement of 769 tonnes (757 long tons) when at the surface and 871 tonnes (857 long tons) while submerged. She had a total length of 67.10 m (220 ft 2 in), a pressure hull length of 50.50 m (165 ft 8 in), a beam of 6.20 m (20 ft 4 in), a height of 9.60 m (31 ft 6 in), and a draught of 4.74 m (15 ft 7 in). The submarine was powered by two MAN M 6 V 40/46 four-stroke, six-cylinder supercharged diesel engines producing a total of 2,800 to 3,200 metric horsepower (2,060 to 2,350 kW; 2,760 to 3,160 shp) for use while surfaced, two Brown, Boveri & Cie GG UB 720/8 double-acting electric motors producing a total of 750 metric horsepower (550 kW; 740 shp) for use while submerged. She had two shafts and two 1.23 m (4 ft) propellers. The boat was capable of operating at depths of up to 230 metres (750 ft).

The submarine had a maximum surface speed of 17.7 knots (32.8 km/h; 20.4 mph) and a maximum submerged speed of 7.6 knots (14.1 km/h; 8.7 mph). When submerged, the boat could operate for 80 nautical miles (150 km; 92 mi) at 4 knots (7.4 km/h; 4.6 mph); when surfaced, she could travel 8,500 nautical miles (15,700 km; 9,800 mi) at 10 knots (19 km/h; 12 mph). U-78 was fitted with two 53.3 cm (21 in) torpedo tubes at the bow, fourteen torpedoes, one 8.8 cm (3.46 in) SK C/35 naval gun, 220 rounds, and a 2 cm (0.79 in) C/30 anti-aircraft gun. The boat had a complement of between forty-four and sixty.

== Service history ==
U-78 spent the majority of her career as a training U-boat, during which time she had several different crews. As a result, she never sank any enemy vessels nor engaged any enemy ships or convoys. On 1 March 1945, she was transferred to the 4th U-boat Flotilla but never saw any combat; prior to beginning her first patrol she was sunk on 16 April 1945. U-78's fate is notable in that she was the only German U-boat to be sunk by land-based artillery fire during World War II.

=== Use as a training boat ===
U-78 spent almost her entire career as part of the 22nd U-boat Flotilla as a "school boat", a role which saw her being used to train U-boat crews. During this time, her commander was changed six times: in July 1941 from Kapitänleutnant (Kptlt.) Alfred Dumrese to Oberleutnant zur See (O/L) Kurt Makowski, who remained in command until February 1942 when she was handed over to Kptlt. Max Bernd Dieterich; in July 1942, Kptlt. Ernst Ziehm took command of the U-boat from Dieterich in November 1942. Kptlt. Helmut Sommer took command from Ziehm in May 1943; the sixth commander of U-78 took control of the U-boat when Wilhelm Eisele was named captain and lastly, the seventh commander, O/L Horst Hübsch, took command of U-78 from Eisele on 27 November 1944. All of U-78's changes of command took place while the U-boat was still serving as a training boat. Crewmembers used her as a practice submarine before being assigned to their operational U-boat.

=== Sinking ===
By March 1945, the war was coming to an end, the Kriegsmarine was faced with a dwindling number of active U-boats. To offset this, the Navy looked to transfer boats away from other duties, such as training. On 1 March 1945, U-78 began active service with the 4th U-boat Flotilla. Just a month and a half later, however, on 16 April 1945, U-78 was sunk after being attacked by Soviet land-based artillery while she was docked near the electricity supply pier in the German port of Pillau in East Prussia.

== Bibliography ==
- Busch, Rainer; Röll, Hans-Joachim (1999). German U-boat commanders of World War II: a biographical dictionary. Translated by Brooks, Geoffrey. London, Annapolis, Md: Greenhill Books, Naval Institute Press. ISBN 1-55750-186-6.
- Busch, Rainer; Röll, Hans-Joachim (1999). Der U-Boot-Krieg, 1939-1945: Deutsche U-Boot-Verluste von September 1939 bis Mai 1945 [German U-boat losses from September 1939 to May 1945] (in German). Vol. IV. Hamburg, Berlin, Bonn: Mittler. ISBN 3-8132-0514-2.
- Gröner, Eric; Jung, Dieter; Maass, Martin (1991). German Warships 1815-1945: U-boats and Mine Warfare Vessels. Vol. 2. Translated by Thomas, Keith; Magowan, Rachel. London: Conway Maritime Press. ISBN 0-85177-593-4.
