= VPB-127 =

Patrol Bombing Squadron 127
- Active: 1 February 1943 – 10 July 1945
- Country: United States of America
- Branch: United States Navy
- Type: squadron
- Role: Maritime patrol
- Engagements: World War II

Aircraft flown
- Patrol: PV-1

VPB-127 was a Patrol Bombing Squadron of the U.S. Navy. The squadron was established as Bombing Squadron 127 (VB-127) on 1 February 1943, redesignated Patrol Bombing Squadron 127 (VPB-127) on 1 October 1944 and disestablished on 10 July 1945.

== Operational history ==
- 1 February – 19 April 1943: VB-127 was established on 1 February at NAS DeLand, Florida, under the operational control of FAW-12, as a medium bombing squadron flying the PV-1 Ventura. The squadron remained at NAS DeLand for ground school and flight training in SNB-1s until the arrival of the squadron’s Venturas on 19 March. Training continued at DeLand until mid-April. On 19 April, the squadron was relocated to NAAF Boca Chica, Florida, for operational training. Although the squadron was not the first landplane patrol squadron in the Navy, it had the distinction of being the first to have the new VB designation that officially replaced the former VP prefix for all land-based patrol squadrons after 1 March 1943.
- 10 May 1943: The squadron began its flight south to NAF Natal, Brazil, coming under the operational control of FAW-16 after its arrival on 14 May. Repair and maintenance facilities were inadequate, forcing the squadron to cannibalize one of its own aircraft shortly after arrival to have a supply of parts for the others. The primary missions assigned were anti-shipping patrols, Anti-submarine warfare (ASW) coverage and convoy protection on an average of two or three times each week. Patrols usually lasted six and a half hours, the maximum endurance of the Ventura with a margin for safe return to base. Patrols were run in cooperation with VBs 129 and 107, also based at NAF Natal.
- 21 June 1943: An eight-aircraft detachment was sent to NAF Fortaleza, Brazil. This split arrangement remained in effect during the entire deployment. The same repair and maintenance problems existed as at Natal. One perfectly good aircraft was grounded and designated as spare parts.
- 30 July 1943: Lieutenant (jg) W. C. Young and crew attacked and sank U-591 off Recife, Brazil. Twenty-eight survivors out of a crew of 49, including the commanding officer, were picked up by USS Saucy.
- 1 August 1943: Lieutenant J. R. Marr lost power in his starboard engine on takeoff from NAF Natal and crashed into the water. The accident killed five personnel and injured five others, most of whom had been aboard as passengers en route to Natal on administrative matters.
- 2 September 1943: VB-127 was withdrawn from NAF Natal and assigned duty in the Mediterranean. On 6 September, the squadron reported to FAW-15 after arriving at NAS Port Lyautey, French Morocco. The mission at this location remained much the same as at Natal, antishipping and ASW patrols over the convoy lanes. On 30 November, a detachment was sent to Agadir, French Morocco, for ASW sweeps in the vicinity of the Canary Islands. The sweeps covered the principal islands of the group at a distance of 6 miles (9.7 km) off shore.
- 29 September 1943: Lieutenant (jg) T. W. DuBose crashed into the top of a hill 15 miles (24 km) northeast of Ben Ahmed, French Morocco. Cause of the accident was unknown and all hands were lost.
- 28 October 1943: Lieutenant A. C. Berg and Lieutenant (jg) W. C. Young were on ASW patrol in two squadron Venturas in the vicinity of the Canary Islands when attacked by two Spanish Air Force CR-42 fighters from Gando Field. The attackers were repulsed with no injuries to personnel or damage to either VB-127 aircraft. One of the CR-42s was hit and made a forced landing on the beach near Gando Field.
- 24 February 1944: U-761 was detected by PBY-5 Catalinas of VP-63 using their MAD gear during an attempt to pass through the Straits of Gibraltar. The U-boat was attacked by a British Catalina of No. 202 Squadron RAF and a PV-1 of VB-127. Lieutenant P. L. Holmes, pilot of the VB-127 Ventura, assisted in the kill by dropping depth charges on U-761 when it surfaced. Following the attack by VB-127, the U-boat was scuttled near Tangier, in view of approaching British destroyers. The crew of 51 was picked up by HMS Anthony and HMS Wishart. This was the first sinking of a submarine aided by MAD equipment.
- 4 April 1944: Lieutenant (jg) D. L. Schlater and crew were killed in a crash during a test flight 8 miles (13 km) from NAS Port Lyuatey, the cause of the crash was never determined.
- 24 June – 27 September 1944: A four-aircraft detachment was sent to Algiers, Algeria, for temporary duty with the Commander, Eighth Fleet. On 28 June two more aircraft joined the detachment. Principal duties involved transportation of personnel, cargo and mail from Algiers to Naples, Italy, prior to the invasion of southern France. The detachment rejoined the squadron at NAF Port Lyautey on 27 September.
- 16 June 1945: Following the German surrender in May, operational flights officially ended.
- 21 June – 10 July 1945: VPB-127 was relieved for return to the United States, arriving at NAS Quonset Point on 23 June 1945. After issuing orders for demobilization or extension of duty to the personnel remaining, VPB-127 was formally disestablished at NAS Quonset Point on 10 July 1945.

== Aircraft assignments ==
The squadron was assigned the following aircraft, effective on the dates shown:

- PV-1 - March 1943

== Home port assignments ==
The squadron was assigned to these home ports, effective on the dates shown:

- NAS DeLand, Florida - 1 February 1943
- NAAF Boca Chica, Florida - 19 April 1943
- NAF Natal, Brazil - 14 May 1943
- NAS Port Lyautey, French Morocco - 6 September 1943
- NAS Quonset Point, Rhode Island - 23 June 1945

== See also ==
- Maritime patrol aircraft
- List of inactive United States Navy aircraft squadrons
- List of United States Navy aircraft squadrons
- List of squadrons in the Dictionary of American Naval Aviation Squadrons
- History of the United States Navy
