= Empire Commerce =

Two ships of the Ministry of War Transport were named Empire Commerce.

- SS Empire Commerce
- MV Empire Commerce
