= George Devereux Belben =

Royal Navy commander

George Devereux Belben DSO DSC AM
- Born: 14 May 1897; Poole, Dorset, England
- Died: 18 February 1944 (aged 46); HMS Penelope (off Anzio, Italy)
- Education: Royal Naval College, Osborne
- Children: David Belben; Timothy Belben; Rosalind Belben
- Military career
- Branch: Royal Navy
- Rank: Commander
- Commands: HMS Wishart; HMS Daring; HMS Ardent; HMS Penelope
- Conflicts: World War I; World War II; Battle of Anzio
- Awards: Distinguished Service Order (DSO); Distinguished Service Cross (DSC); Albert Medal for Lifesaving (AM)

George Devereux Belben DSO DSC AM (14 May 1897 – 18 February 1944) was a decorated officer in the British Royal Navy.

== Early life and education ==
George Devereux Belben was born on 14 May 1897 in Poole, Dorset. He was one of three children of George Belben, a merchant, and Lucy Dickinson. He attended Royal Naval College, Osborne.

== Career ==
Belben was commissioned into the Royal Navy in January 1910. He was appointed a midshipman on 31 July 1914. In August 1914, he was appointed to the Monmouth-class armoured cruiser HMS Cumberland. He was mentioned in a report by a senior officer in the Royal Navy for his successful landings. In 1915, he was appointed to the super-dreadnought battleship HMS Canada and then to HMS Penelope in August 1916. He was promoted to the rank of sub-lieutenant in 1917, and lieutenant on 15 July 1918.

In early 1918, Belben served in the Apollo-class 2nd class protected cruiser HMS Thetis during the Zeebrugge Raid, where he was responsible for safely escorting the men off the ship after its senior officers were incapacitated or killed. In recognition, he was awarded the Distinguished Service Cross (United Kingdom) (DSC). On 16 September 1918, Belben and three other seamen aided the evacuation of the Glatton, which had experienced an explosion while lying in the Dover harbor. The rescuers boarded the burning ship in order to evacuate survivors who had been trapped in the mess deck and the superstructure. Belben was later awarded the Albert Medal for Lifesaving (AM) for his efforts in the Glatton.

Promoted to lieutenant commander on 15 February 1926, Belben served on HMS Renown from 1930 to 1931. He was promoted to the rank of commander on 31 December 1931 and was then appointed as a gunnery officer to the battleship HMS Nelson in 1933. From 10 October 1934 to November 1934, he was appointed to the command of HMS Wishart. In late November 1943, he succeeded Louis Mountbatten, 1st Earl Mountbatten of Burma as captain of HMS Daring; on 8 June 1935, he was succeeded by Geoffrey Barnard in this role. In May 1936, he served as captain of HMS Ardent.

He was promoted to the rank of captain in 1939.

=== Command of HMS Penelope and death ===
Belben held command of HMS Penelope from 10 August 1942 to 18 February 1944.

On 18 February 1944, Penelope was sunk during the Battle of Anzio; 417 of the personnel on board, including Belben, were killed. The ship left Naples to return to the Anzio area when she was torpedoed at 40.55°N 13.25°E by the German submarine U-410 under the command of Horst-Arno Fenski. A torpedo struck her in the after engine room and was followed sixteen minutes later by another torpedo that hit in the after boiler room, causing her immediate sinking. Belben remained in the water, "encouraging poor swimmers. He brought five ratings to a waiting LST (Landing Ship Tank) but refused to be taken from the water himself before others. When finally taken aboard he was covered in engine oil and did not survive." A memorial plaque commemorating those lost is in St Ann's Church, HM Dockyard, Portsmouth. 206 of the 623 crew total survived.

In recognition, Belben was posthumously awarded the Distinguished Service Order (DSO).

== Personal life ==
Belben married his cousin, Joyce Pamela May Belben, granddaughter of William Henry Foster, in 1928 in Wimborne, Dorset. The couple had two sons, David Belben, born 1929, and Timothy Belben, born 1931, and one daughter, novelist Rosalind Belben, born 1941.
