= VPB-63 =

Patrol Bombing Squadron 63
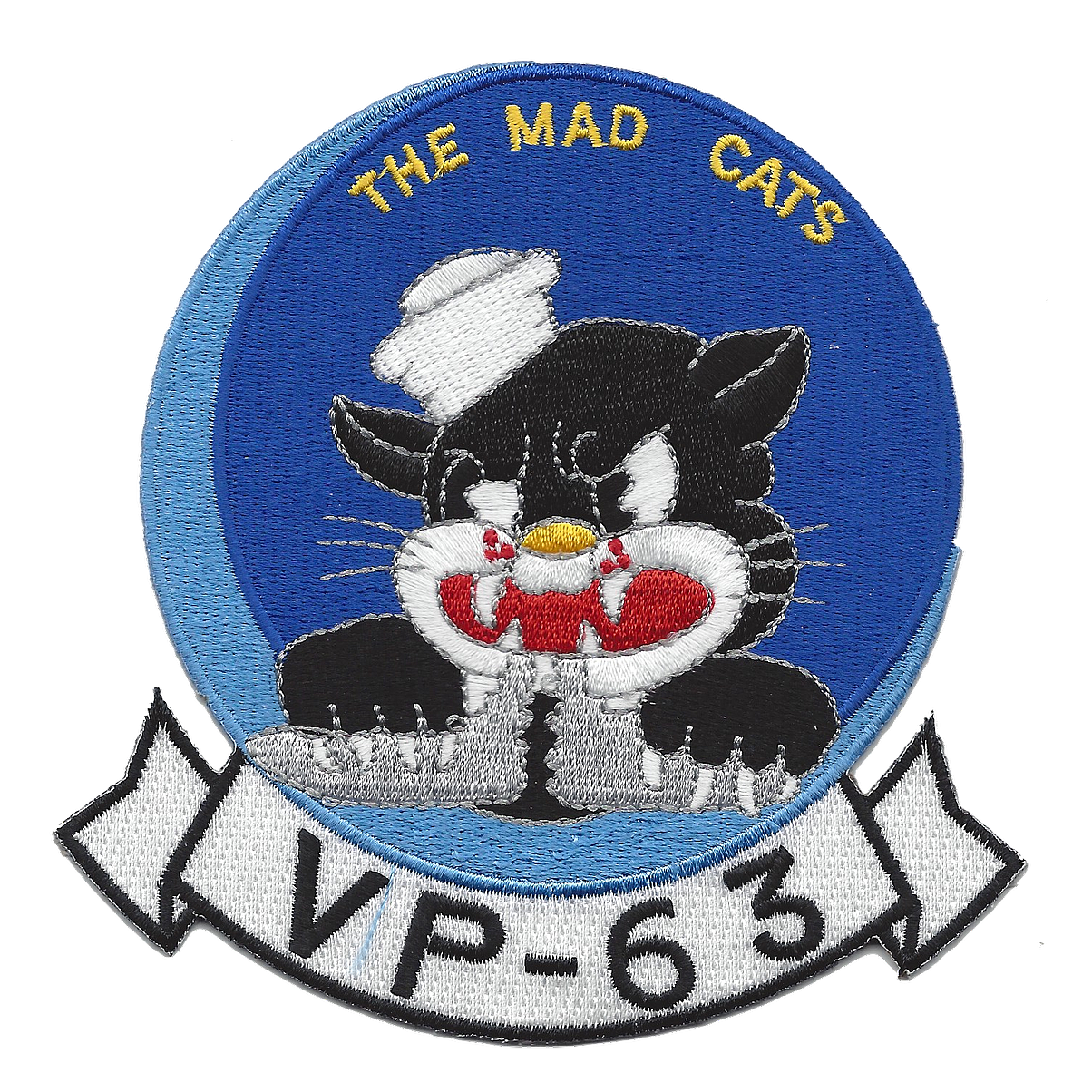
- VP-63 patch
- Active: 19 September 1942 – 2 July 1945
- Country: United States of America
- Branch: United States Navy
- Type: squadron
- Role: Maritime patrol
- Nickname(s): Mad Cats
- Engagements: World War II

Aircraft flown
- Patrol: PBY Catalina

VPB-63 was a Patrol Bombing Squadron of the U.S. Navy. The squadron was established as Patrol Squadron 63 (VP-63) on 19 September 1942, redesignated as Patrol Bombing Squadron 63 (VPB-63) on 1 October 1944 and disestablished on 2 July 1945.

== Operational history ==
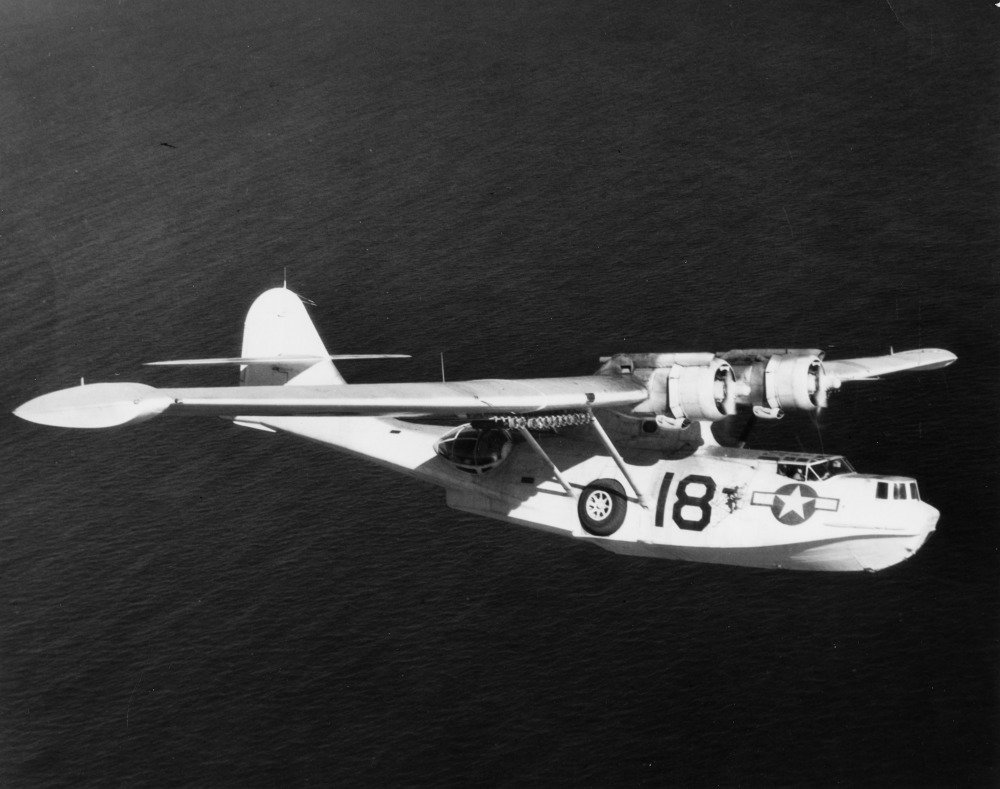
VPB-63 PBY-5A near Gibraltar

- 19 September 1942: VP-63 was established at NAS Alameda, California, under the operational control of PatWing-8, as a seaplane squadron flying the PBY-5A Catalina. The squadron was originally intended to be used in the South Pacific as a Black Cat squadron operating out of Guadalcanal, but shortly after its establishment a decision was made to use it as a test bed for two new technological innovations - Magnetic anomaly detector (MAD) equipment and retro-firing rockets. The MAD gear was designed to detect the presence of a submarine underwater, while the 12 (later 15) retro-firing rockets overcame the tendency of air-dropped depth charges to overshoot the target by canceling out the bomb's forward trajectory as soon as it was dropped. A third device was soon added to the squadron's arsenal, the passive-listening sonobuoy. This equipment was dropped over the suspected location of a submarine and allowed the aircraft PPC to determine with a high degree of accuracy the target's depth and position.
- 2 November 1942: VP-63 ferried nine PBY-5As to NAS Kaneohe Bay, Hawaii. The flight provided valuable experience for the squadron's upcoming trans-Pacific flight.
- 5–7 December 1942: A full squadron alert took all available aircraft into the Pacific on long-range search patrols for Japanese carriers believed to be coming in under cover a weather front to make a sneak raid on the California coast. No enemy vessels were sighted, but the patrols gave the squadron valuable experience in rough weather operations.
- 31 December 1942: A VP-63 Catalina piloted by Lieutenant James E. Breeding made a night crash landing at sea 5 miles (8.0 km) off the coast of Oregon. Although all eight of the crew were able to board life rafts before the plane sank, all but one drowned in the surf while coming ashore.
- 1 January 1943: The squadron's success in tactical exercises resulted in an increase in the complement from 12 to 18 aircraft and crews.
- 14 February 1944: Lieutenant (jg) Henry Kovacs made a crash landing in San Francisco Bay. Three crewmen were killed, including Lieutenant (jg) Kovacs.
- 15 Mar 1943: VP-63 departed NAS Alameda for NAS San Diego, California. On the 16th, the squadron was officially detached from FAW-8 and assigned to FAW-5. On the 17th the squadron departed San Diego for NAS Elizabeth City, North Carolina, via Salton Sea, California; NAS Corpus Christi, Texas; and NAS Pensacola and NAS Jacksonville, Florida. Upon arrival, the aircrews were given a brief course on use of searchlights in Anti-submarine warfare (ASW) operations.
- 30 March 1943: Lieutenant Frederick A. Brown and his entire crew were lost in a crash off Albemarle Sound, while on a searchlight training flight.
- 4–18 April 1943: A six-aircraft detachment was sent to NAS Key West for duty under the operational control of FAW-12. Two days later the rest of the squadron was transferred to NAS Quonset Point, Rhode Island, for operations under FAW-9. The detachment rejoined the squadron there on 18 April 1943.
- 24 April 1943: A four-aircraft detachment was sent to NAS Jacksonville, returning to NAS Quonset Point on 6 June 1943.
- 2 May 1943: A two-aircraft detachment was sent to NAS Bermuda for ASW operations, returning to NAS Quonset Point on 24 May 1943.
- 22–23 June 1943: VP-63 departed NAS Quonset Point for RAF Pembroke Dock, South Wales, for operations with the RAF Coastal Command and assignment to the operational control of FAW-7. On 23 July 1943, VP-63 became the first U.S. patrol squadron to operate from the United Kingdom in the campaign against U-boats.
- 28 July 1943: Lieutenant (jg) Samuel R. Parker caught two U-boats on the surface while on patrol. Both remained on the surface putting up a fierce concentration of antiaircraft fire that prevented him from attacking. Two RAF flying boats soon arrived on the scene, forcing the U-boats to dive. Subsequent attacks by the combined aircraft were unsuccessful.
- 1 August 1943: On one of the squadron's patrols in the Bay of Biscay, a VP-63 aircraft piloted by Lieutenant William P. Tanner, was attacked by eight German Ju 88 fighters. In the ensuing combat, two of the enemy aircraft were claimed shot down and one damaged. Lieutenant Tanner was also shot down, but survived with two members of his crew. This encounter marked the first aerial combat between U.S. Naval Aviation and the Luftwaffe. The Ju 88 encounters were not accidental; the aircraft were part of KG 40, a special squadron of heavy fighters tasked with finding and shooting down Allied ASW aircraft searching for German U-boats. Postwar examination of German records indicate that only one enemy fighter was actually shot down, a Ju 88C-6 Werk No. 360118from 13/KG 40. The German crew was rescued later by one of their seaplanes.
- 16–26 December 1943: U-boat hunting in the Bay of Biscay was no longer productive and was a waste of the squadron's MAD resources. VP-63 departed RAF Pembroke Dock en route to Naval Air Station Port Lyautey, French Morocco, for better hunting grounds in the Mediterranean. Two aircraft remained at Pembroke Dock to continue operations with the RAF in experimental countermeasures being developed for use against the V-1 flying bomb. While en route to Port Lyautey on 25 December 1943, squadron commanding officer Lieutenant Commander Curtis Hutchings came under fire from a group of six enemy destroyers that had put to sea under cover of the bad weather. After relaying the position of the enemy vessels, the Royal Navy arrived and sank three of the destroyers. The remainder of the squadron arrived without incident at Port Lyautey on 26 December 1943, coming under the operational control of FAW-15. Squadron operations consisted almost solely of antisubmarine warfare patrols in the Straits of Gibraltar and the Mediterranean.
- 9 Jan 1944: Lieutenant Woodrow E. Sholes crashed during takeoff from the Oued Sebou River at Port Lyautey. Two crewmen survived the accident.
- 20 January 1944: The two aircraft remaining at RAF Pembroke Dock rejoined the squadron at NAF Port Lyautey.
- 8 February 1944: A two-aircraft barrier patrol was established between the southern tip of Spain and the tip of Spanish Morocco. The aircraft flew at an altitude of only 55-foot (17 m) from dawn to dusk, in all sorts of weather. Spanish antiaircraft batteries in Spanish Morocco frequently shot at the patrolling aircraft whenever they flew close to the 3 miles (4.8 km) limit.
- 24 Feb 1944: U-761 was detected by PBY-5 Catalinas of VP-63 during an attempt to pass through the Straits of Gibraltar. The two VP-63 PBYs, piloted by Lieutenants Howard Baker and T. R. Woolley, used their MAD gear to detect, track and assist in the sinking of U-761, Oberleutnant Horst Geider commanding. The U-boat was attacked by a British Catalina of No. 202 Squadron RAF and a PV-1 Ventura of VB-127. Lieutenant P. L. Holmes, pilot of the VB-127 Ventura, assisted in the kill by dropping depth charges on U-761 when it surfaced. It was the first sinking of a submarine aided by MAD equipment. Following the attack by VB-127, the U-boat was scuttled near Tangier, in view of approaching British destroyers. The crew of 51 was picked up by HMS Anthony and HMS Wishart.
- 16 March 1944: Squadron aircraft piloted by Lieutenant (jg) M. J. Vopatek, Lieutenant R. C. Spears, and Lieutenant (jg) V. A.T. Lingle detected U-392, Oberstleutenant Henning Schümann commanding, during an attempted passage of the Straits of Gibraltar. Lieutenant (jg) Vopatek guided HMS Affleck into position with his MAD gear. Affleck fired a pattern of depth charges that sent the U-boat to the bottom.
- 15 Apr 1944: Lieutenant (jg) Vopatek and Lieutenant H. L. Worrell repeated the performance of 16 March, when they detected U-731, Oberstleutenant Alexander Graf von Keller commanding, attempting to cross the straits. Subsequent attacks by the aircraft did not sink the U-boat but both aircraft continued to track the submarine, guiding HMS Kilmarnock into position for a successful Hedgehog attack that sent the submarine to the bottom. This sinking was to be the last in the Mediterranean theater, as the squadron had, in the words of British Admiral Sir Andrew Cunningham " . . . turned the Mediterranean into an Allied lake."
- 6 December 1944: The squadron was reduced to 12 aircraft with three spares. The resulting surplus personnel were returned to the U.S. for reassignment to other patrol squadrons.
- 10 January 1945: A detachment of aircraft was sent to RNAS Dunkeswell, Devon, England, for operations with RAF Coastal Command, under the operational control of FAW-7.
- 30 April 1945: Lieutenant F. G. Lake, from the Dunkeswell Detachment, sighted U-1107 while submerged with only its snorkel visible. The U-boat, commanded by Kapitänleutnant Fritiz Parduhn, was quickly sunk by a spread of 30 retro contact bombs fired by the MAD signature, rather than visual sighting.
- 11 May 1945: U-541, Kapitänleutnant Kurt Petersen commanding, surrendered to PPC Lieutenant W. D. Ray. The U-boat was fully surfaced and raised the black flag in accordance with surrender instructions. Lieutenant Ray circled the U-boat for two hours until surface units arrived on the scene. A guard crew was then put aboard and the submarine was escorted to Gibraltar.
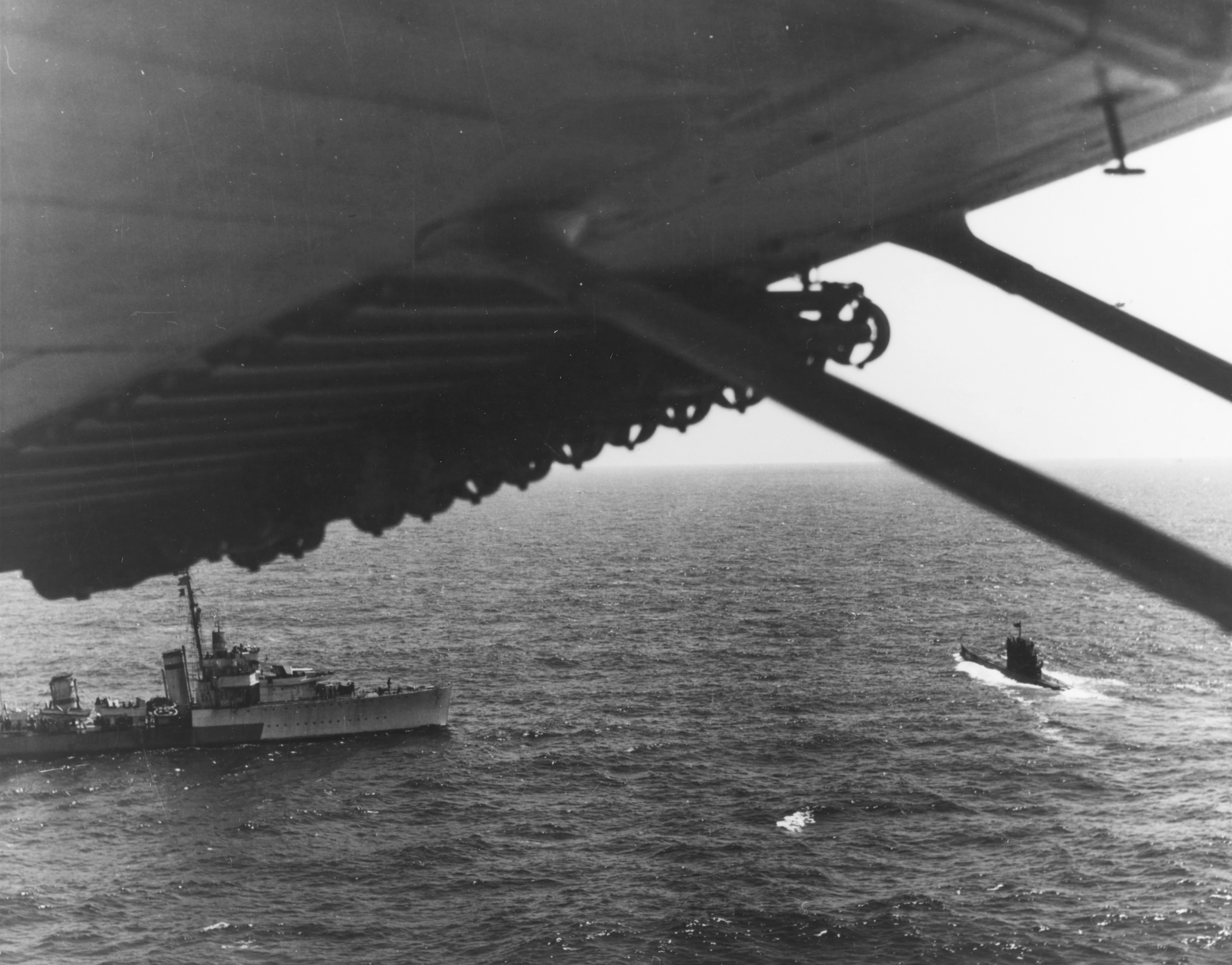
  Destroyer HMS Malcolm approaching German submarine U-541 after the U-Boat surrendered, 11 May 1945 off Portugal, photographed from a PBY from VPB-63.
- 4 June 1945: Orders were received to stand down for return to NAS Norfolk, Virginia, and disestablishment. The squadron departed Port Lyautey and Dunkeswell, with all personnel arriving at Norfolk by 21 June 1945.
- 2 Jul 1945: VPB-63 was disestablished at NAS Norfolk.

== Aircraft assignments ==
The squadron was assigned the following aircraft, effective on the dates shown:

- PBY-5A - September 1942
- PBY-5A MAD - October 1942

== Home port assignments ==
The squadron was assigned to these home ports, effective on the dates shown:

- NAS Alameda, California - 19 September 1942
- NAS Elizabeth City, North Carolina - 23 March 1943
- NAS Quonset Point, Rhode Island - 6 April 1943
- RAF Pembroke Dock, England - 22 June 1943
- NAS Port Lyautey, French Morocco - 16 December 1943
- NAS Norfolk, Virginia - 21 June 1945

== See also ==
- Maritime patrol aircraft
- List of inactive United States Navy aircraft squadrons
- List of United States Navy aircraft squadrons
- List of squadrons in the Dictionary of American Naval Aviation Squadrons
- History of the United States Navy
