= USS LST-348 =

LST-1-class tank landing ship

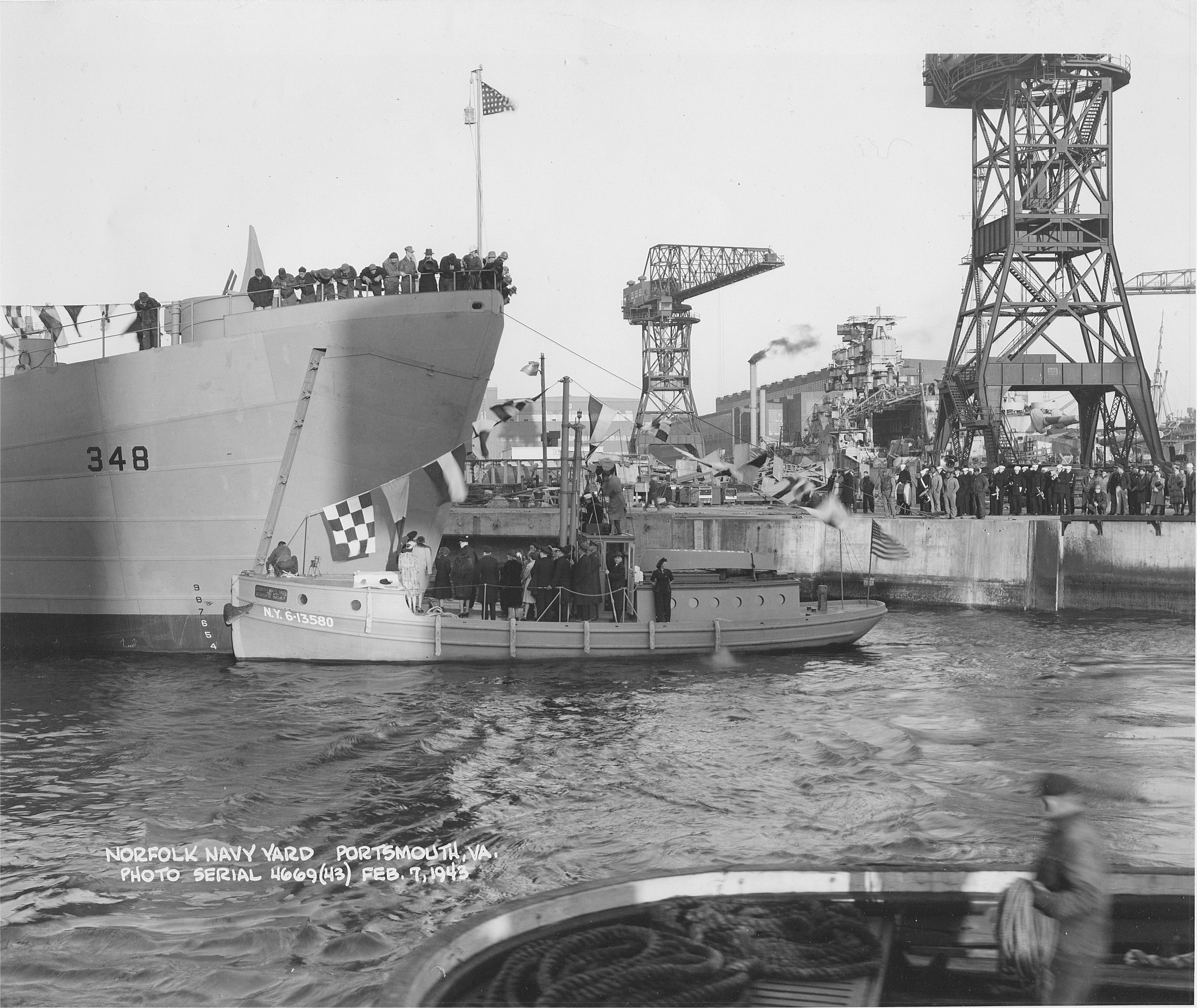
- LST-348 at Portsmouth, February 1943

History

United States
- Name: LST-348
- Builder: Norfolk Navy Yard
- Laid down: 10 November 1942
- Launched: 7 February 1943
- Commissioned: 9 February 1943
- Honours and awards: 2 battle stars (World War II)
- Fate: Sunk 20 February 1944

General characteristics
- Class & type: LST-1-class tank landing ship
- Displacement: 1,625 long tons (1,651 t) light; 4,080 long tons (4,145 t) full (sea-going draft with 1675 ton load)
- Length: 328 ft 0 in (99.97 m)
- Beam: 50 ft (15 m)
- Draft: Light: 2 ft 4 in (0.71 m) forward; 7 ft 6 in (2.29 m) aft; Sea-going: 8 ft 3 in (2.51 m) forward; 14 ft 1 in (4.29 m) aft; Landing (with 500 ton load): 3 ft 11 in (1.19 m) forward; 9 ft 10 in (3.00 m) aft
- Propulsion: 2 General Motors 12-567 900 hp (671 kW) diesel engines, two shafts, twin rudders
- Speed: 11.6 knots (21.5 km/h; 13.3 mph)
- Range: 24,000 nmi (44,000 km) at 9 kn (17 km/h; 10 mph)
- Boats & landing craft carried: 2 × LCVPs
- Complement: 13 officers, 104 enlisted
- Armament: 2 × twin 40 mm gun mounts; 4 × single 40 mm gun mounts; 12 × single 20 mm gun mounts

USS LST-348 was a United States Navy LST-1-class tank landing ship that was built and deployed during World War II. The ship was constructed throughout late 1942 and early 1943 before being deployed to the European theater, where it undertook supply operations in support of Allied troops in North Africa and Italy. It was sunk by a German U-boat in February 1944.

== Construction ==
LST-348 was constructed at the Norfolk Naval Yard beginning on 10 November 1942, to be used for convoy operations in the European theater. The ship was launched on 7 February 1943 and commissioned two days later. Under the command of Lieutenant Stephenson Jennings, an officer in the United States Naval Reserve, the ship was assigned to the European theater.

== Service history ==
LST-348 joined the Italian Campaign of World War II by July 1943 deploying supplies and reinforcements throughout North Africa and Italian coastline in support of the Allied invasion of Sicily. In September 1943, the ship supported Operation Avalanche, the landings at Salerno. On 22 January 1944, LST-348 was assigned to support the Anzio beachhead. In late January, the ship was heavily attacked by Axis aircraft while operating around the beachhead, resulting in several near misses. After moving further south, the ship came under heavy bombardment from shore-based artillery before being relieved by LST-377 in early February.

On 20 February 1944, while sailing from Nisida to Anzio, LST-348 was struck on her port side by a torpedo fired from the German U-boat U-410. LST-348 was struck once more on her port side before orders were received to abandon ship. The ship was the ordered to be scuttled starting a large fire on board which would be extinguished once a third and final torpedo would sink the ship. Twenty-four members of the ship's crew perished, while 79 were rescued. Two battle stars were awarded to the ship for its World War II service. Following the ship's sinking, an investigation found that at the time of the attack, LST-348 had not been at the required readiness condition. Her guns had not been manned and only limited lookouts had been stationed. Jennings was subsequently reprimanded for these oversights.
