= Hound Music =

2001 novel by Rosalind Belben

- First edition
- Author: Rosalind Belben
- Language: English
- Publisher: Chatto & Windus
- Publication date: 2001
- Publication place: United Kingdom
- Media type: Print
- Pages: 306
- ISBN: 978-0-7011-7277-0
- Followed by: Our Horses in Egypt

Hound Music by English author Rosalind Belben has been described by The Atlantic Companion to Literature as a 'fine historical novel'. Published in 2001 by Chatto and Windus it is set at the beginning of the twentieth century in rural England and concerns fox-hunting.

== Plot introduction ==
George Lupus is Master of Quarr Hunt and his four children also love the thrill of the hunt, but their passion is not shared by Dorothy, wife and mother. On George's untimely death, Dorothy attempts to disband the hunt, but she does not reckon on the determination of her children to maintain the tradition...

== Reception ==
Reviews differed widely. The Spectator wrote called it a 'subtle, brilliant and paradoxical novel... No one has ever written better than she does here about the English upper-class cult of fox-hunting pre-1914...'. and The Telegraph was similarly effusive: 'It is a beautiful, resonant book about a hidden world ... The charm of this strange, haunting novel lies in her extraordinary ability not merely to describe, but to convey the very texture of whatever she is writing about ... She inhabits not just human skins but those of horse, hound and fox. At times she even contrives to become the landscape across which all these creatures enact their drama of pursuit.' The review concludes: 'It is a piece of virtuosity that should be required reading for anyone who wishes to understand hunting, rather than merely hold a prejudice about it.'

In contrast, Alfred Hickling in The Guardian complains 'what strikes you most about Rosalind Belben's evocation of early 20th-century countryfolk is her cacophonously awful prose. She frequently lapses into incomprehensible rural jargon – one chapter is bafflingly entitled "Breaking off and the Poultry-Fund Certifier". I had begun to hope that it was a Stella Gibbons-style parody, but the stoic humourlessness suggests she might be in earnest.'

MJ Fitzgerald wrote in Rain Taxi that "This is the novel that should have won the 2001 Booker prize, but of course it was not even on the long short list".

== Sequel ==
Characters from Hound Music appear in Belben's next novel Our Horses in Egypt set twenty years later.

== Publication history ==
- 2001, UK, Chatto & Windus, ISBN 978-0-7011-7277-0, Pub date Aug 2001, Hardback
- 2002, UK, Vintage, ISBN 978-0-09-942954-8, Pub date Nov 2002, Paperback
