= HMS Penelope (97) =

1935 Arethusa-class cruiser

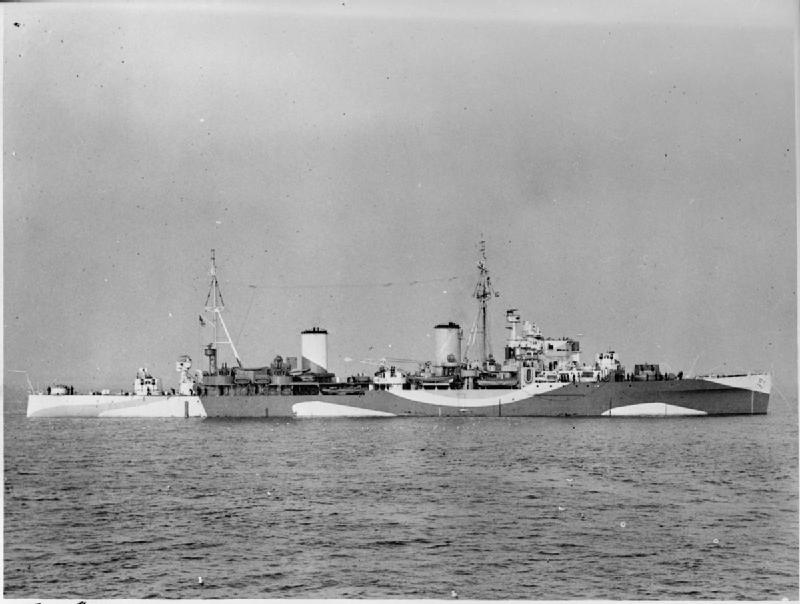
- HMS Penelope at Spithead, December 1942

History

United Kingdom
- Name: Penelope
- Builder: Harland & Wolff, Belfast
- Yard number: 940
- Laid down: 30 May 1934
- Launched: 15 October 1935
- Completed: 15 November 1936
- Commissioned: 13 November 1936
- Identification: Pennant number: 97
- Fate: Torpedoed and sunk, 18 February 1944

General characteristics
- Class & type: Arethusa-class light cruiser
- Displacement: 5,220 tons standard load; 6,665 tons full load
- Length: 506 ft (154 m)
- Beam: 51 ft (16 m)
- Draught: 14 ft (4.3 m)
- Propulsion: Four Parsons geared steam turbines; Four Admiralty 3-drum oil-fired boilers; Four shafts; 64,000 shp
- Speed: 32 knots (59 km/h)
- Range: Unknown; 1,325 tons fuel oil
- Complement: 500
- Armament: Original configuration: 6 × BL 6-inch (152 mm) gun; 4 (2 × 2) 4-inch (102 mm) AA guns; 8 (2 × 4) 0.5-inch (12.7 mm) machine guns; 6 (2 × 3) 21-inch (533 mm) torpedo tubes; August 1940 configuration: 3 × 6-inch (152 mm) dual guns; 4 × 4-inch (102 mm) dual AA guns; 2 × quadruple mount QF 2-pdr (40 mm) "pom-pom" AA guns; 6 × 20 mm Oerlikon single AA guns; 2 × 0.5 inch quadruple machine guns; 2 × 21 in (533 mm) triple torpedo tubes
- Armour: Original configuration: One to three inches - magazine protection; 2.25 inches - belt; One inch - deck, turrets and bulkheads
- Aircraft carried: One aircraft (later removed).

HMS Penelope was an Arethusa-class light cruiser of the Royal Navy. She was built by Harland & Wolff (Belfast, Northern Ireland); her keel was laid down on 30 May 1934. She was launched on 15 October 1935, and commissioned 13 November 1936. She was torpedoed and sunk by the German U-boat U-410 near Naples with great loss of life on 18 February 1944. On wartime service with Force K, she was holed so many times by bomb fragments that she acquired the nickname "HMS Pepperpot".

== History ==
=== Home Fleet ===
At the outbreak of World War II Penelope was with the 3rd Cruiser Squadron in the Mediterranean, having arrived at Malta on 2 September 1939. Penelope and her sister ship Arethusa were reallocated to the 2nd Cruiser Squadron in the Home Fleet and arrived at Portsmouth on 11 January 1940. On 3 February she left for the River Clyde en route to Rosyth, arrived on 7 February and operated with the 2nd Cruiser Squadron on convoy escort duties. In April and May 1940, she took part in the Norwegian Campaign.

On 11 April Penelope ran aground off Fleinvær while hunting German merchant ships entering the Vestfjord. Her boiler room was flooded and she was holed forward. The destroyer Eskimo towed her to Skjelfjord where an advanced base had been improvised. Despite air attacks, temporary repairs were made and she was towed home a month later. She arrived at Greenock in Scotland on 16 May 1940 where additional temporary repairs were carried out, before proceeding on 19 August to the Tyne for permanent repairs.

After repairs and trials were completed in August 1941, Penelope reappeared as 'a new ship from the water line down'. She returned to the 2nd Cruiser Squadron at Scapa Flow on 17 August 1941. On 9 September she left Greenock escorting the battleship Duke of York to Rosyth. Later that month she was employed in patrolling the Iceland–Faroes passage to intercept enemy surface ships.

On 6 October 1941 Penelope left Hvalfjord, Iceland, with another battleship, King George V, escorting the aircraft carrier Victorious for the successful Operation E. J., an air attack on German shipping between Glom Fjord and the head of West Fjord, Norway. The force returned to Scapa Flow on 10 October 1941.

=== Force K ===
Penelope and her sister Aurora were then assigned to form the core of Force K based at Malta and departed Scapa on 12 October 1941, arriving in Malta on 21 October. On 8 November, both cruisers and their escorting destroyers sailed from Malta to intercept an Italian convoy of six destroyers and seven merchant ships sailing for Libya, which had been sighted by aircraft at 37°53'N – 16°36'E. During the ensuing Battle of the Duisburg Convoy on 9 November off Cape Spartivento, the British sank one enemy destroyer (Fulmine) and all of the merchant ships.

On 23 November, Force K sailed again to intercept another enemy convoy; next day they sank two more merchant ships, Maritza and Procida, west of Crete. Force K received the Prime Minister's congratulations on their fine work. On 1 December 1941, Force K sank the Italian merchant vessel Adriatico, at 32°52'N – 2°30'E, the destroyer Alvise da Mosto, and the tanker Iridio Mantovani at 33°45'N – 12°30'E. The First Sea Lord congratulated them on 3 December.

On 19 December, while operating off Tripoli, Penelope struck a mine but was not seriously damaged, although the cruiser Neptune and the destroyer HMS Kandahar were sunk by mines in the same action. Penelope was sent into the dockyard for repairs and returned to service at the beginning of January 1942. On 5 January, she left Malta with Force K, escorting the Special Service Vessel Glengyle to Alexandria (Operation ME9), returning on 27 January, escorting the supply ship Breconshire.

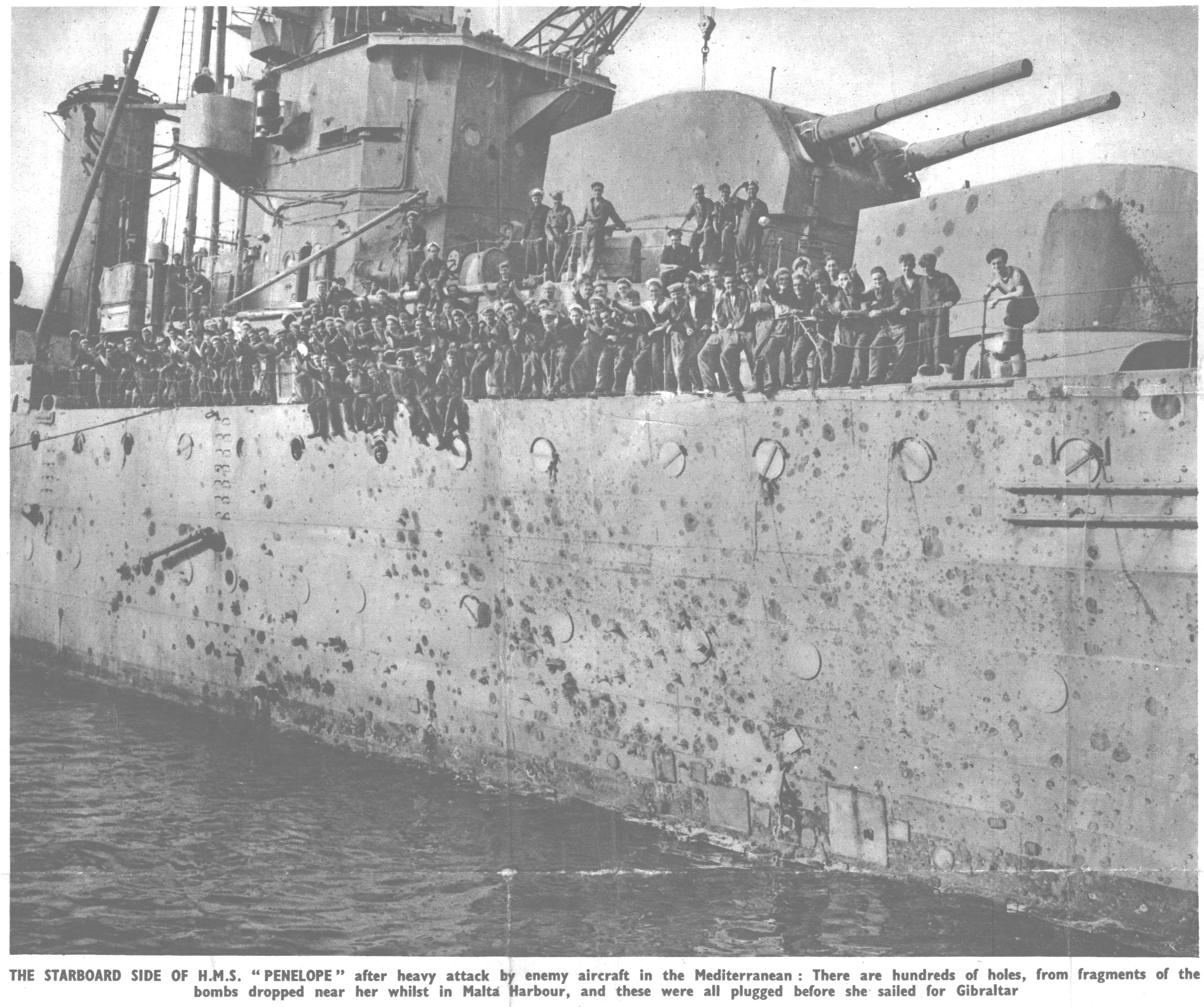
Damage to Penelope June 1942

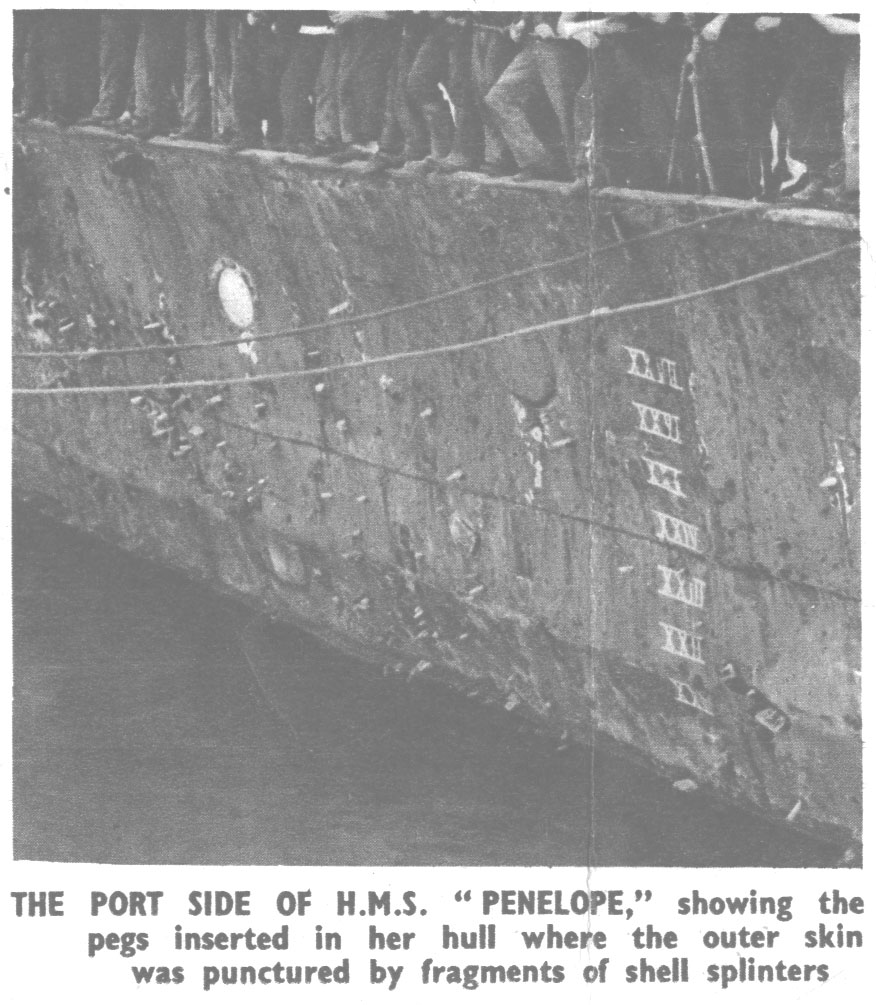
Close-up of damage to Penelope in June 1942

She left Malta, again with Breconshire on 13 February 1942 and an eastbound convoy aided by six destroyers, Operation MG5, returning to Malta on 15 February, with the destroyers Lance and Legion. On 23 March, she left Malta with Legion for Operation MG1, a further convoy to Malta. Breconshire was hit and taken in tow by Penelope and was later safely secured to a buoy in Marsaxlokk harbour, the whole operation was under the charge of Penelope's commanding officer, Captain A. D. Nicholl, of whose work the Naval Officer In Command (NOIC), Malta expressed appreciation.

Penelope was holed both forward and aft by near-misses during air attacks on Malta on 26 March. While in the island, she was docked and repaired at the Malta Dry Docks. Day after day she was attacked by German aircraft and the crew worked to fix a myriad of shrapnel holes, so many that she was nicknamed HMS Pepperpot; when these had been plugged with long pieces of wood, HMS Porcupine. Penelope gun-loader Albert Hewitt was blown off his feet but regained consciousness still safely holding a four inch shell. Penelope sailed for Gibraltar on 8 April, and on the next day was repeatedly attacked from the air. She arrived in Gibraltar on 10 April, with further damage from near-misses. Later that day she received a signal from Vice Admiral, Malta, "True to your usual form. Congratulations".

=== Repairs and awards ===
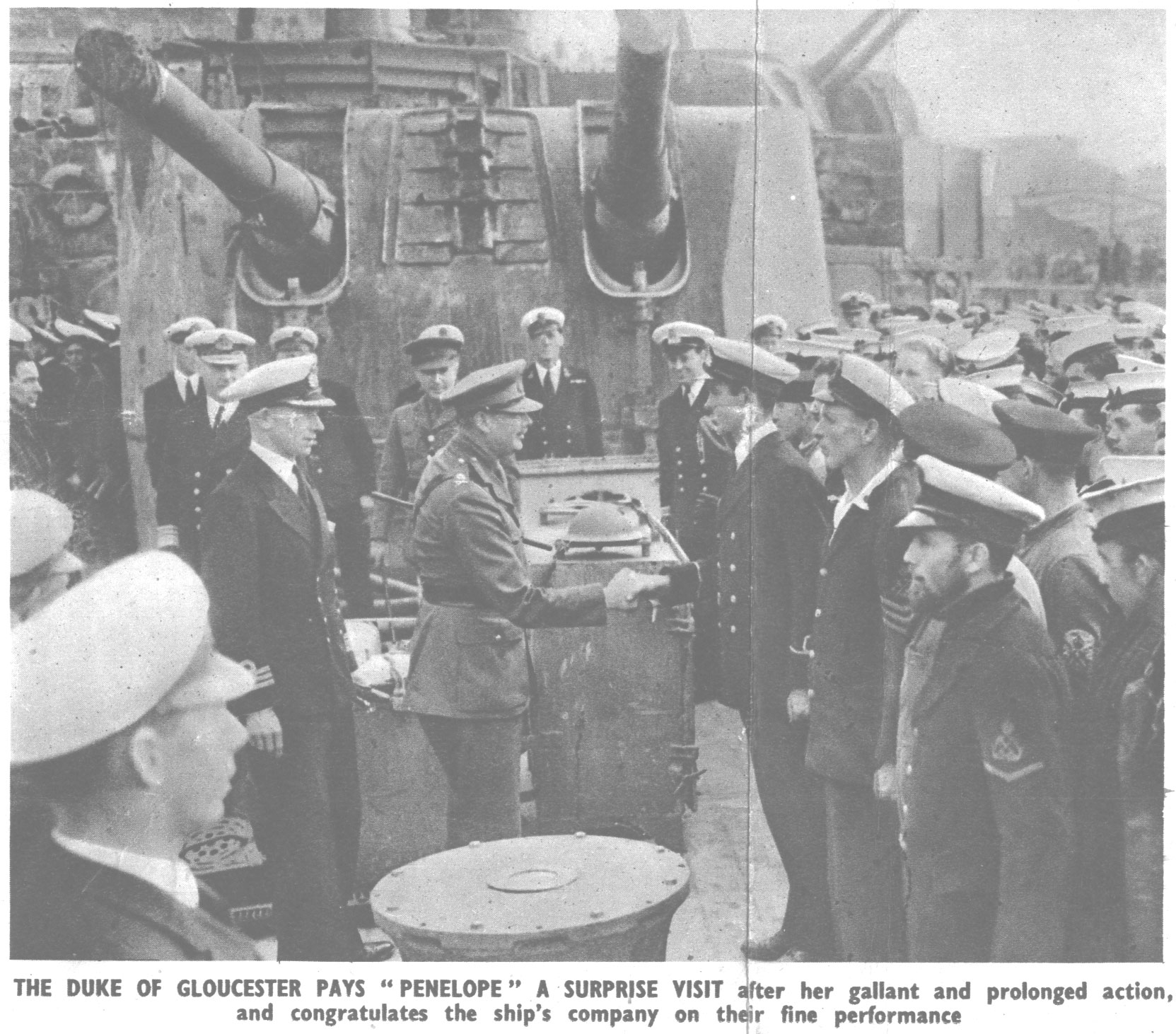
The Duke of Gloucester visiting Penelope

The damage was extensive and required several months at home after temporary repairs in Gibraltar. The ship was visited by the Duke of Gloucester, who had originally laid down her keel plate, on 11 April. The duke also visited Captain Nicholl in hospital. The First Sea Lord congratulated the ship on her successful arrival in Gibraltar. The question of Penelope's repairs had been reconsidered, and it was decided to send her to the United States. She accordingly left Gibraltar on 10 May 1942 for the Navy Yard at New York, via Bermuda, arriving on 19 May. She was under repair until September and arrived in Norfolk, Virginia on 15 September, proceeding, again via Bermuda, to Portsmouth, England, which she reached on 1 October 1942. The King, at an investiture at Buckingham Palace, decorated 21 officers and men from Penelope as "Heroes of Malta". Among their awards were two Distinguished Service Orders, a Distinguished Service Cross and two Distinguished Service Medals.

=== Western Mediterranean ===
Penelope arrived at Scapa Flow on 2 December and remained in home waters until the middle of January 1943. She left the Clyde on 17 January for Gibraltar, where she arrived on 22 January. She had been allocated to the 12th Cruiser Squadron, in which she operated with the Western Mediterranean Fleet under the flag of Admiral Sir Andrew Cunningham during the follow-up of Operation Torch, the landings in North Africa.

On 1 June 1943, Penelope and the destroyers Paladin and Petard shelled the Italian island of Pantelleria. The force received enemy gunfire in return and Penelope was hit once but suffered little damage. On 8 June 1943, with the cruiser Newfoundland and other ships, she took part in a further heavy bombardment of the island. A demand for its surrender was refused. The same force left Malta on 10 June, to cover the assault (Operation Corkscrew), which resulted in the surrender of the island on 11 June 1943. On 11 and 12 June Penelope also took part in the attack on Lampedusa, which fell to the British forces on 12 June 1943.

On 10 July 1943, with Aurora and two destroyers, Penelope carried out a diversionary bombardment of Catania as part of the conquest of Sicily, (Operation Husky, the Allied invasion of Sicily). The flotilla then moved to Taormina where the railway station was shelled. On 11 July, Penelope left Malta with the 12th Cruiser Squadron as part of Force H to provide cover for the northern flank of the assault on Sicily. During the remainder of July and August, she took part in various other naval gunfire support and sweeps during the campaign for Sicily.

=== Force Q ===
On 9 September 1943, Penelope was part of Force Q for Operation Avalanche, the allied landings at Salerno, Italy, during which she augmented the bombardment force. Penelope left the Salerno area on 26 September with Aurora and at the beginning of October was transferred to the Levant in view of a possible attack on the island of Kos in the Dodecanese. On 7 October, with the cruiser Sirius and other ships, she sank six enemy landing craft, one ammunition ship and an armed trawler off Stampalia. While the ships were retiring through the Scarpanto Straits south of Rhodes, they were attacked by 18 Ju 87 "Stuka" dive-bombers of I Gruppe Sturzkampfgeschwader 3 MEGARA. Although damaged by a bomb, Penelope was able to return to Alexandria at 22 knots (41 km/h; 25 mph). On 19 November 1943 the ship moved to Haifa in connection with possible developments in the Lebanon situation. Towards the end of 1943, she was ordered to Gibraltar for Operation Stonewall, (anti-blockade-runner duties), in the Atlantic. On 27 December, the forces in this operation destroyed the German blockade-runner Alsterufer, sunk by aircraft co-operating with Royal Navy ships. Penelope returned to Gibraltar on 30 December and took part in Operation Shingle, the amphibious assault on Anzio, Italy, providing gunfire support as part of Force X with USS Brooklyn on 22 January 1944. She also assisted in the bombardments in the Formia area during the later operations. She made eight shoots on 8 February.

=== Sinking ===
On 18 February 1944, Penelope, under the command of George Devereux Belben, was leaving Naples to return to the Anzio area when she was torpedoed at 40.55°N 13.25°E by the German submarine U-410 under the command of Horst-Arno Fenski. A torpedo struck her in the aft engine room and was followed sixteen minutes later by another torpedo that hit in the aft boiler room, causing her to immediately begin sinking; 417 of the crew, including the captain, went down with the ship; there were only 206 survivors. A memorial plaque commemorating those lost is in St Ann's Church, HM Dockyard, Portsmouth.

== Cultural references ==
C. S. Forester, author of the Horatio Hornblower series of sea stories set at the time of the Napoleonic Wars, published his novel The Ship in May 1943. It is set in the war in the Mediterranean and follows a Royal Navy light cruiser in an action where it defeats a superior Italian force. The author dedicated the book "with the deepest respect to the officers and crew of HMS Penelope". The story of the fictional HMS Artemis is based on, but does not follow in detail, the Second Battle of Sirte. The book was published before Penelope was sunk. Former British politician Penelope "Penny" Mordaunt is named after Penelope.
