= Rosalind Belben =

English novelist

Rosalind Belben FRSL
- Born: Rosalind Loveday Belben; 1 February 1941 (age 85); Dorset, England
- Occupation: Novelist
- Parent(s): George Deveraux Belben and Joyce Belben

Rosalind Loveday Belben (born 1 February 1941) is an English novelist.

== Life and education ==
Born in Dorset on 1 February 1941 and educated in neighbouring Devon, Belben is the daughter of George Devereux Belben DSO DSC AM Capt. RN and Joyce Belben.

Belben lives in Bere Regis.

== Career ==
Belben began her career intending to write for the stage. After two years in theatre, she turned her attention elsewhere. Belben's debut book, a collection of two stories called Bogies, was published in 1972. It was followed up by Reuben, Little Hero in 1973 and The Limit in 1974, which was reissued in 2023 to critical praise.

Her next book, Dreaming of Dead People, was published in 1979 and aims to "stare at the human body, warts and all" in the same manner as visual artforms. The book has been described as "autofiction". Dreaming of Dead People was republished by And Other Stories in 2025, and was shortlisted for the Republic of Consciousness Prize US and Canada.

In 1989, Belben published Is Beauty Good, a set of thirty vignettes concerned with, among other themes, loss of the natural world, human folly, and the book's title question. Maggie Gee, writing for The Observer, noted Belben's "photographic eye for natural beauty" and commitment to taking "extreme formal risks." Is Beauty Good was republished by And Other Stories in 2026 to renewed critical acclaim, with the Guardian praising its uncompromising strangeness and its "undiluted commitment to the author's singular spirit."

Later works include Choosing Spectacles (1995) and Hound Music (2001). The follow-up, Our Horses in Egypt (2007), won the James Tait Black Award. Choosing Spectacles is soon to be republished by And Other Stories.

Belben is a Fellow of the Royal Society of Literature.

Lynne Segal described her as a "somewhat neglected author and elegant stylist", and praised Dreaming of Dead People.

== Novels ==
- Bogies (1972)
- Reuben Little Hero (1973)
- The Limit (1974)
- Dreaming of Dead People (1979)
- Is Beauty Good (1989)
- Choosing Spectacles (1995)
- Hound Music (2001)
- Our Horses in Egypt (2007)
