= SS Goodleigh (1928) =

1928 British and German cargo ship

History
- Name: Goodleigh (1928–37); Christoph Van Doornum (1937–39); Empire Commerce (1939–40)
- Owner: Dulverton Steamship Co Ltd (1928–37); Reunert & Co GmbH (1937–39); Canadian Government (1939); Ministry of War Transport (1939–40)
- Operator: Dulverton Steamship Co Ltd (1928–37); Fisser & Van Doornum (1937–39); H Chisholm & Co Ltd (1939–40)
- Port of registry: (United Kingdom) London (1928–37); (Nazi Germany) Hamburg (1937–39); (United Kingdom) London (1939–40)
- Builder: J L Thompson & Sons Ltd
- Launched: 1928
- Completed: March 1928
- Out of service: 9 June 1940
- Identification: Code Letters LBHC (1928–34); Code Letters GNQB (1934–37); Code Letters DJVA (1937–39); Code Letters GLVA (1939–40); United Kingdom Official Number 160368 (1928–37, 1939–40)
- Fate: Struck a mine and beached

General characteristics
- Type: Cargo ship
- Tonnage: 3,845 GRT (Goodleigh); 3,751 GRT (Christoph Van Doornum); 3,857 GRT (Empire Commerce); 2,323 NRT (Goodleigh); 2,240 NRT (Christoph Van Doornum); 2,302 NRT (Empire Commerce)
- Length: 360 ft 0 in (109.73 m)
- Beam: 50 ft 0 in (15.24 m)
- Depth: 23 ft 9 in (7.24 m)
- Installed power: Triple expansion steam engine
- Propulsion: Screw propeller

Goodleigh was a 3,857 GRT cargo ship that was built in 1928 by J L Thompson & Sons Ltd, Sunderland for the Dulverton Steamship Company. In 1937 she was sold to Fisser & Van Doornum, Emden and was renamed Christian Van Doornum. She was in port in Canada when war was declared between the United Kingdom and Germany. She was seized as a war prize and passed to the Ministry of War Transport (MoWT). Renamed Empire Commerce, she served until 9 June 1940 when she struck a mine off Margate, Kent. She was beached and her cargo was salvaged, but Empire Commerce was deemed a constructive total loss and was scrapped in situ. She was the first Empire ship lost through enemy action in the Second World War.

== Description ==
The ship was built by J L Thompson Ltd, Sunderland. She was launched in 1928, and completed in March of that year.

The ship was 360 feet 0 inches (109.73 m) long, with a beam of 50 feet 0 inches (15.24 m) and a depth of 23 feet 9 inches (7.24 m). She had a GRT of 3,845 and a NRT of 2,323.

The ship was propelled by a triple expansion steam engine, which had cylinders of 24 inches (61 cm), 40 inches (100 cm) and 66 inches (170 cm) diameter by 45 inches (110 cm) stroke. The engine was built by J Dickinson & Sons Ltd, Sunderland.

== History ==
Goodleigh was built for the Dulverton Steamship Co Ltd. Her port of registry was London. The United Kingdom Official Number 160368 and Code Letters LBHC were allocated. In 1934, her Code Letters were changed to GNQB.

In 1937, Goodleigh was sold to Reunert & Co GmbH and was renamed Christoph Van Doornum. She was placed under the management of Fisser & Van Doornum, Emden. Her port of registry was changed to Hamburg and the Code Letters DJVA were allocated. She was now listed as 3,741 GRT, 2,240 NRT. On 4 September 1939, Christoph Van Doornum was in port at Botwood, Newfoundland. War was declared between the United Kingdom and Germany and the ship was seized by the Canadian authorities. The actual arrest of the ship being carried out by the town's Sheriff. This may have been the first act of war during the Second World War on the continent of North America.

Christoph Van Doornum was declared a war prize. She was passed to the MoWT and renamed Empire Commerce. She was placed under the management of H Chisholm & Co Ltd. Her port of registry was changed to London and the Code Letters GLVJ were allocated. She was reallocated the United Kingdom Official Number 160368. Empire Commerce was now listed as 3,857 GRT, 2,302 NRT. On 9 June 1940, Empire Commerce struck a mine off Margate, Kent and was severely damaged. She was beached on the Mucking Sands where her cargo of woodpulp was discharged. The engine room was severely damaged. Greaser Maurice Holden escaped from the engine room, but then realised that the engineer was trapped, went back in and rescued him. For his bravery, Holden was awarded a British Empire Medal. Empire Commerce was declared a constructive total loss and was scrapped in situ. She was the first Empire ship to be lost through enemy action.
