= German submarine U-410 =

German type VIIC world war II submarine

History

Nazi Germany
- Name: U-410
- Ordered: 30 October 1939
- Builder: Danziger Werft, Danzig
- Yard number: 111
- Laid down: 9 January 1941
- Launched: 14 October 1941
- Commissioned: 23 February 1942
- Fate: Sunk on 11 March 1944 by US aircraft

General characteristics
- Class & type: Type VIIC submarine
- Displacement: 769 tonnes (757 long tons) surfaced; 871 t (857 long tons) submerged
- Length: 67.10 m (220 ft 2 in) o/a; 50.50 m (165 ft 8 in) pressure hull
- Beam: 6.20 m (20 ft 4 in) o/a; 4.70 m (15 ft 5 in) pressure hull
- Height: 9.60 m (31 ft 6 in)
- Draught: 4.74 m (15 ft 7 in)
- Installed power: 2,800–3,200 PS (2,100–2,400 kW; 2,800–3,200 bhp) (diesels); 750 PS (550 kW; 740 shp) (electric)
- Propulsion: 2 shafts; 2 × diesel engines; 2 × electric motors
- Speed: 17.7 kn (32.8 km/h; 20.4 mph) surfaced; 7.6 knots (14.1 km/h; 8.7 mph) submerged
- Range: 8,500 nmi (15,700 km; 9,800 mi) at 10 knots (19 km/h; 12 mph) surfaced; 80 nmi (150 km; 92 mi) at 4 knots (7.4 km/h; 4.6 mph) submerged
- Test depth: 230 m (750 ft); Crush depth: 250–295 m (820–968 ft)
- Complement: 4 officers, 40–56 enlisted
- Armament: 5 × 53.3 cm (21 in) torpedo tubes (four bow, one stern); 14 × torpedoes; 1 × 8.8 cm (3.46 in) deck gun (220 rounds); 1 × 3.7 cm (1.5 in) Flak M42 AA gun; 2 × 2 cm (0.79 in) C/30 AA guns

Service record
- Part of: 5th U-boat Flotilla; 23 February – 31 August 1942; 7th U-boat Flotilla; 1 September 1942 – 31 May 1943; 29th U-boat Flotilla; 1 June 1943 – 11 March 1944
- Identification codes: M 43 581
- Commanders: K.Kapt. Kurt Sturm; 23 February 1942 – 4 February 1943; Oblt.z.S. Horst-Arno Fenski; 5 February 1943 - 11 March 1944
- Operations: 7 patrols: 1st patrol: 27 August - 28 October 1942; 2nd patrol: 3 December 1942 - 4 January 1943; 3rd patrol: 9 February - 27 March 1943; 4th patrol: 26 April - 13 May 1943; 5th patrol: 7 - 30 August 1943; 6th patrol: 12 September - 3 October 1943; 7th patrol: 3 - 28 February 1944
- Victories: 7 merchant ships sunk (47,244 GRT); 2 warships sunk (6,895 tons); 1 merchant ship total loss (3,722 GRT); 1 merchant ship damaged (7,134 GRT)

German submarine U-410 was a Type VIIC U-boat built for Nazi Germany's Kriegsmarine during World War II, operating mainly in the Mediterranean. Her insignia was a sword & shield, she did not suffer any casualties until she was sunk.

U-410 was first commanded by Kapitänleutnant Kurt Sturm during her working up/training period and on her first patrol before being commanded by Horst-Arno Fenski for her six combat patrols. U-410 sank seven merchantmen, a Landing ship, Tank (LST); and a light cruiser during the Second World War. For his successes, Fenski received the Knight's Cross.

== Design ==
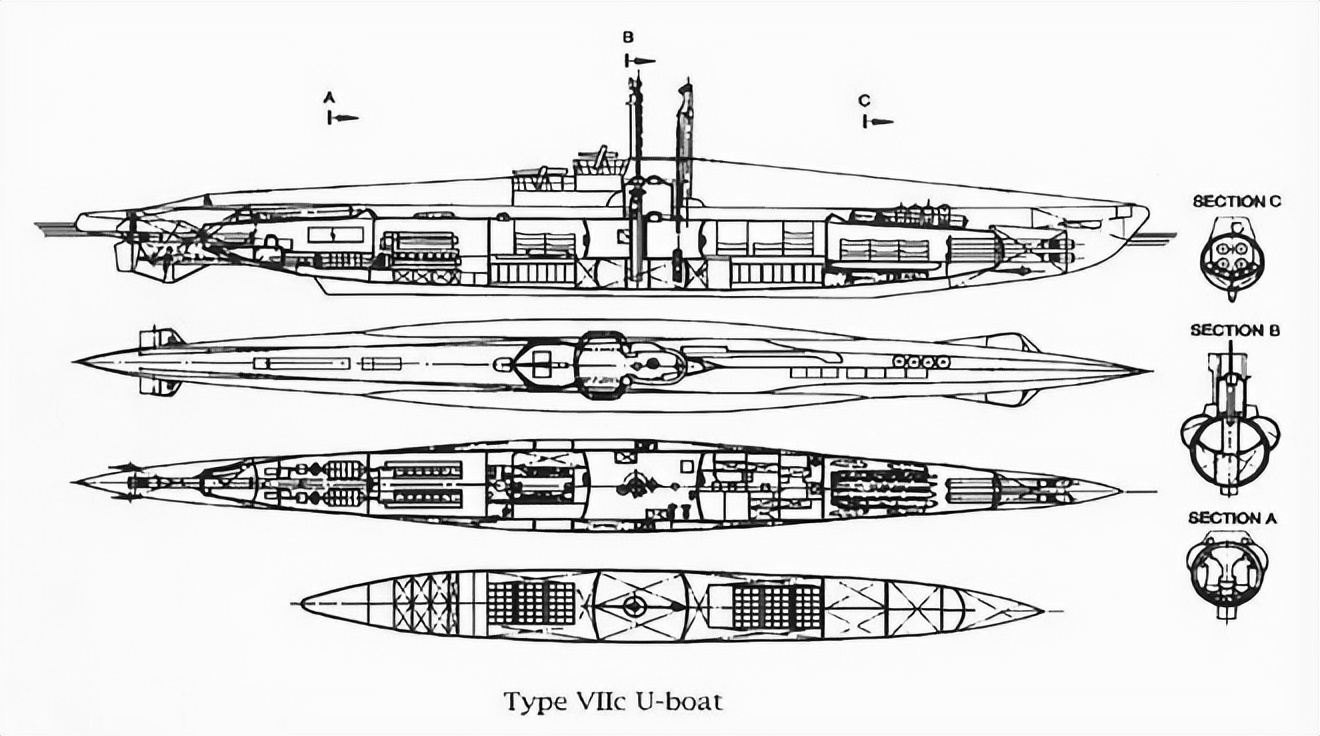
A cross-section of a Type VIIC submarine

German Type VIIC submarines were preceded by the shorter Type VIIB submarines. U-410 had a displacement of 769 tonnes (757 long tons) when at the surface and 871 tonnes (857 long tons) while submerged. She had a total length of 67.10 m (220 ft 2 in), a pressure hull length of 50.50 m (165 ft 8 in), a beam of 6.20 m (20 ft 4 in), a height of 9.60 m (31 ft 6 in), and a draught of 4.74 m (15 ft 7 in). The submarine was powered by two Germaniawerft F46 four-stroke, six-cylinder supercharged diesel engines producing a total of 2,800 to 3,200 metric horsepower (2,060 to 2,350 kW; 2,760 to 3,160 shp) for use while surfaced, two Siemens-Schuckert GU 343/38–8 double-acting electric motors producing a total of 750 metric horsepower (550 kW; 740 shp) for use while submerged. She had two shafts and two 1.23 m (4 ft) propellers. The boat was capable of operating at depths of up to 230 metres (750 ft).

The submarine had a maximum surface speed of 17.7 knots (32.8 km/h; 20.4 mph) and a maximum submerged speed of 7.6 knots (14.1 km/h; 8.7 mph). When submerged, the boat could operate for 80 nautical miles (150 km; 92 mi) at 4 knots (7.4 km/h; 4.6 mph); when surfaced, she could travel 8,500 nautical miles (15,700 km; 9,800 mi) at 10 knots (19 km/h; 12 mph). U-410 was fitted with five 53.3 cm (21 in) torpedo tubes (four fitted at the bow and one at the stern), fourteen torpedoes, one 8.8 cm (3.46 in) SK C/35 naval gun, 220 rounds, a twin 2 cm (0.79 in), on Platform I, a 3.7 cm (1.5 in), on Platform II and two MG 15 machine guns on the bridge. The boat had a complement of between forty-four and sixty.

She carried two eight-man, one six-man and 58 one-man, rubber boats.

== Service history ==
U-410 was ordered by the Kriegsmarine on 30 October 1939. She was laid down at the Danziger Werft yard in Danzig, on 9 January 1941 and launched on 14 October 1941. She was formally commissioned into the Kriegsmarine, on 23 February 1942.

=== 1st and 2nd patrols ===
U-410 departed Kiel on 27 August 1942 for her first patrol. The U-boat, under Kapitänleutnant Kurt Sturm, sank the British Newton Pine in mid-Atlantic. She then arrived in St. Nazaire in France on 28 October 1942, after 63 days at sea.

Her second outing was not so productive; after 33 days she returned to her French base empty-handed.

=== 3rd and 4th patrols ===
Her third foray was more productive and included the sinking of the British ship Fort Battle River on 6 March 1943. She also damaged another British vessel in the same engagement, Fort Paskoyac. Both of these ships were attacked southwest of Portugal. The U-boat returned to St. Nazaire on 27 March 1943.

Her fourth sortie included transiting the heavily defended Strait of Gibraltar. She arrived in La Spezia in Italy on 13 May 1943, having left St. Nazaire on 26 April.

=== 5th and 6th patrols ===
U-410 left La Spezia on 7 August 1943 and attacked the convoy UGS-14 off the Algerian coast. Firing three torpedoes in a 'spread', she hit and sank two American ships, John Bell and Richard Henderson on 26 August 1943. She then sailed to Toulon in France, arriving on 30 August.

The U-boat tried to disrupt the landings at Anzio, sinking a British light cruiser and an American LST (see below).

== Combat history ==
=== Commanders ===
- 23 February 1942 – 4 February 1943 Kapitänleutnant Kurt Sturm.
- 5 February 1943 – 11 March 1944 Oberleutnant zur See Horst-Arno Fenski

=== Flotillas ===
- 23 February – 31 August 1942 - 5th U-boat Flotilla
- 1 September 1942 – 31 May 1943 - 7th U-boat Flotilla
- 1 June 1943 – 11 March 1944 - 29th U-boat Flotilla

=== Wolfpacks ===
U-410 was part of the following "wolfpacks":

Name	From	To	Notes
Lohs	13 September 1942	22 September 1942	
Blitz	22 September 1942	26 September 1942	
Tiger	26 September 1942	29 September 1942	
Letzte Ritter	29 September 1942	1 October 1942	
Wotan	5 October 1942	17 October 1942	
Raufbold	11 December 1942	20 December 1942	
Robbe	16 February 1943	13 March 1943	

=== Rescue of survivors from MV Rhakotis ===
On 2 January 1943, U-410 rescued 80 survivors from the German blockade-runner MV Rhakotis after she was sunk by HMS Scylla. The survivors were returned to St. Nazaire the next day. Among the survivors was one Englishmen (Angus MacDonald) who received a special guard.

=== Sinking of HMS Penelope ===
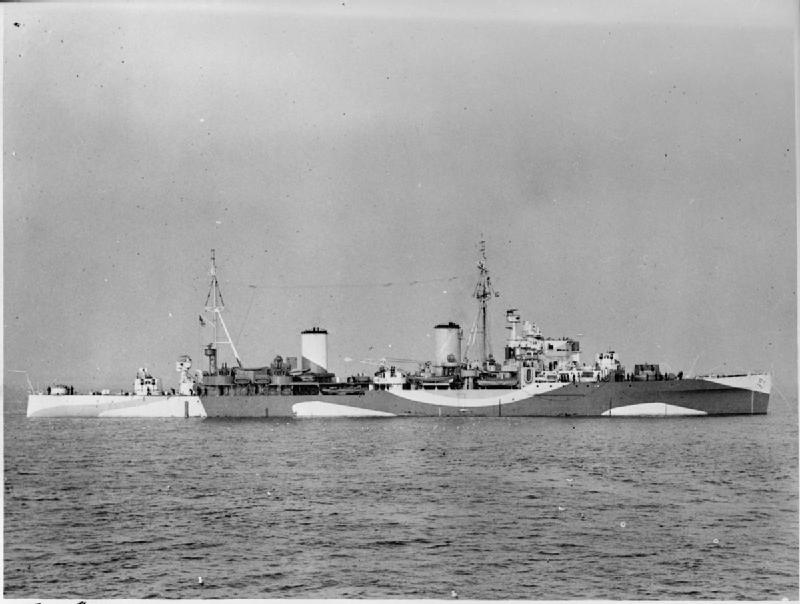
HMS Penelope

On 18 February 1944, HMS Penelope (Capt. G.D. Belben, DSO, DSC, AM, RN), was leaving Naples to return to the Anzio area when she was torpedoed at 40.55°N 13.25°E by U-410. A torpedo struck the British cruiser in the aft engine room; sixteen minutes later, U-410 fired another torpedo that hit Penelope in her boiler room, causing her immediate sinking. 415 of the crew, including the captain, went down with the ship. There were 206 survivors. The cruiser was making 26 knots (48 km/h; 30 mph) when she was hit, the fastest ship ever successfully attacked by a submarine.

=== Sinking of USS LST-348 ===
On 20 February 1944 LST-348 (Landing Ship, Tank) was returning from Sicily, supporting Operation Shingle and roughly 40 miles South of Naples when she was spotted by U-410, who fired two torpedoes at around 02:00 hrs. Both hit the vessel on her port side, she sank 20 minutes later.

=== Loss ===
On 11 March 1944, U-410 along with U-380 were seriously damaged and subsequently declared non-operational. Oberleutnant zur See Fenski and his crew transferred to U-371, which was lost around 04:00 on 4 May 1944 in a battle with Allied warships. Three of the crew were killed as they scuttled the boat, but Fenski survived and spent two years in a US POW camp.

== Summary of raiding history ==
Date	Ship Name	Nationality	Tonnage (Note: Merchant ship tonnages are in gross register tons. Military vessels are listed by tons displacement.)	Fate
11 October 1942	Newton Pine	United Kingdom	4,212	Sunk
6 March 1943	Fort Battle River	United Kingdom	7,133	Sunk
6 March 1943	Fort Paskoyac	United Kingdom	7,134	Damaged
26 August 1943	John Bell	United States	7,242	Sunk
26 August 1943	Richard Henderson	United States	7,194	Sunk
26 September 1943	Christian Michelsen	Norway	7,176	Sunk
1 October 1943	Empire Commerce	United Kingdom	3,722	Total loss
1 October 1943	Fort Howe	United Kingdom	7,133	Sunk
15 February 1944	Fort St. Nicholas	United Kingdom	7,154	Sunk
18 February 1944	HMS Penelope	Royal Navy	5,270	Sunk
20 February 1944	USS LST-348	United States Navy	1,625	Sunk

== Bibliography ==
- Busch, Rainer; Röll, Hans-Joachim (1999). German U-boat commanders of World War II : a biographical dictionary. Translated by Brooks, Geoffrey. London, Annapolis, Md: Greenhill Books, Naval Institute Press. ISBN 1-55750-186-6.
- Busch, Rainer; Röll, Hans-Joachim (1999). Deutsche U-Boot-Verluste von September 1939 bis Mai 1945 [German U-boat losses from September 1939 to May 1945]. Der U-Boot-Krieg (in German). Vol. IV. Hamburg, Berlin, Bonn: Mittler. ISBN 3-8132-0514-2.
- Gröner, Erich; Jung, Dieter; Maass, Martin (1991). U-boats and Mine Warfare Vessels. German Warships 1815–1945. Vol. 2. Translated by Thomas, Keith; Magowan, Rachel. London: Conway Maritime Press. ISBN 0-85177-593-4.
- Kemp, Paul (1999). U-Boats Destroyed - German Submarine Losses in the World Wars. London: Arms & Armour. ISBN 1-85409-515-3.
