= Naval Air Station Port Lyautey =

Former Naval Air Station in Morocco

- Located near Kenitra, Morocco
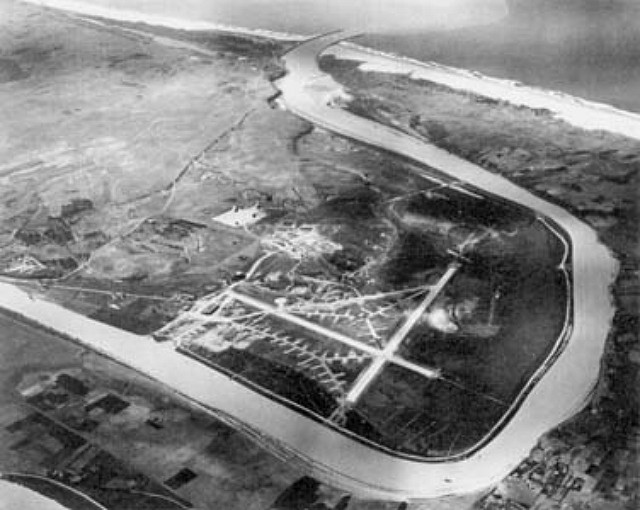

Site information
- Type: Naval Air Station
- Controlled by: French Naval Air Station; United States Navy

Location
- Coordinates: 34°17′56.10″N 006°35′42.84″W

Site history
- Built: 1919 (French)
- In use: 1942–1977

Naval Air Station Port Lyautey is a former United States Navy Naval Air Station in Morocco, about 5 kilometres (3.1 mi) north-northwest of Kenitra and about 120 kilometres (75 mi) northeast of Casablanca. The Naval Air Station was turned over to the Royal Moroccan Air Force and the last of US military personnel departed the base in 1977. The airport was later reopened as Kenitra Air Base after it was closed.

== History ==
=== World War II ===
The facility was established as an Advanced Landing Ground (ALG) shortly after the Operation Torch landing at the former Vichy France airfield at Mehdiya–Port Lyautey. The facility was captured by one American destroyer and a U.S. Army Raider team. The destroyer USS Dallas came up the Sebou River, silenced the shore batteries with its guns and landed the Raider team which in turn captured the airfield.

Location of Naval Air Station Port Lyautey, Morocco

After being secured, the airfield was upgraded by Seabees and used by the United States Army Air Forces Twelfth Air Force 33d Fighter Group, flying P-40 Warhawks. The group took part in initial landings in French Morocco, arriving with the invasion force on 8 November. Remaining aircraft and ground echelon arrived shortly afterward. The Group moved to Casablanca Airfield on 13 November. The 1st Troop Carrier Squadron (10th Troop Carrier Group) operated C-47 Skytrains from the airfield from 11 March to 25 November 1943.

Later, the facility was used by the 2037th Antisubmarine Wing (Provisional), later being redesignated as the 480th Antisubmarine Group of Army Air Forces Antisubmarine Command. The USAAF units used the airfield to patrol the Atlantic Ocean approaches to the Straits of Gibraltar for German U-boats along with two United States Navy PBY Catalina patrol squadrons, one being US Navy Patrol Squadron VP-63 using first generation magnetic anomaly detector (MAD) gear. The units were assigned to the Northwest African Coastal Air Force for administration and placed under the operational control of the United States Navy Fleet Air Wing 15, which answered to the commander of the Moroccan Sea Frontier.

Two USN K-class blimps completed the first transatlantic crossing by non-rigid airships when they landed at Craw Field, Port Lyautey on the evening of 1 June 1944. Blimp Squadron 14 airships K-123 and K-130 were followed by K-109 and K-134 on 15 June and K-101 and K-112 on 1 July 1944. The K-ships flew nighttime antisubmarine patrols using MAD while the PBY Catalinas from Fleet Air Wing 15 flew the dayshift, creating a 24/7 magnetic fence across the Straits of Gibraltar.

In addition, the airfield was used by Air Transport Command. It functioned as a stopover en route to Tafarquay Airport, near Oran, Algeria or to Casablanca Airfield, on the North African Cairo–Dakar transport route for cargo, transiting aircraft and personnel. After the end of the war in Europe, Air Transport Command was assigned several heavy bombardment squadrons by XII Tactical Air Command to transport key personnel back to the United States. Known units assigned were:

- 327th Bombardment Squadron (92d Bombardment Group), 13 May – 9 September 1945, B-17 Flying Fortress
- 365th Bombardment Squadron (305th Bombardment Group), October–December 1946, B-17 Flying Fortress
- 366th Bombardment Squadron (305th Bombardment Group), September–October 1946, B-17 Flying Fortress
- 368th Bombardment Squadron (306th Bombardment Group), February – 15 July 1946, B-17 Flying Fortress
- 416th Bombardment Squadron, after V-E Day
- 423d Bombardment Squadron (306th Bombardment Group), 16 July – September 1946, B-17 Flying Fortress
- 773d Bombardment Squadron (463d Bombardment Group), 15 May – 2 September 1945, B-17 Flying Fortress

=== Cold War ===
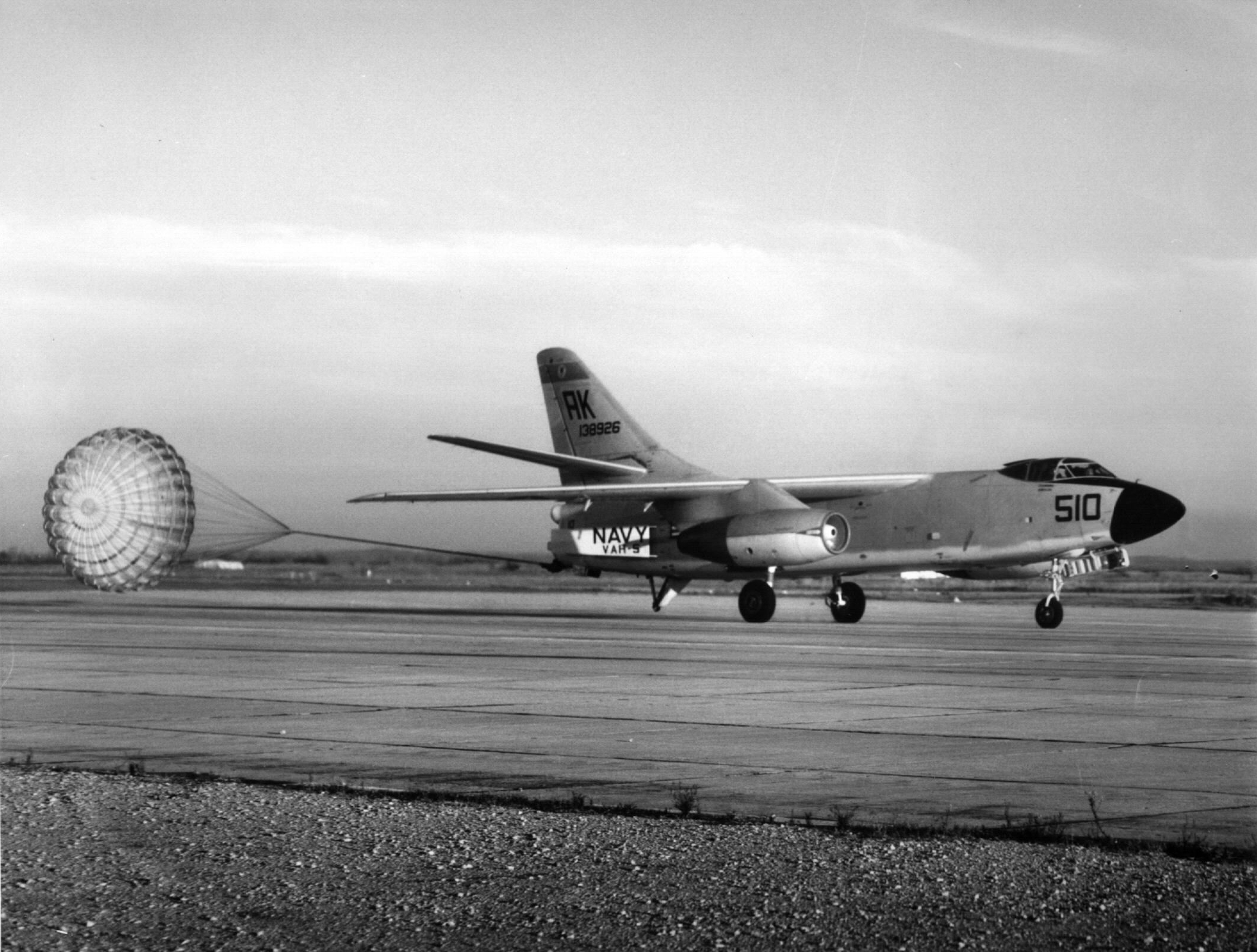
A U.S. Navy A3D-2 Skywarrior landing at Port Lyautey, circa 1958.

The airfield was expanded to a major US Naval Air Station in 1951. It primarily supported land-based naval reconnaissance aircraft, such as the P4M Mercator in the 1950s, the P-2 Neptune in the 1950s and 1960s and the Lockheed P-3 Orion, EP-3 Aries and EA-3 Skywarrior in the 1960s and 1970s.

During the years 1966–69 Kenitra NAS was used also as a training facility by the Royal Moroccan Air Force (RMAF). Personnel from the Moroccan United States Liaison Office (MUSLO), made up of USAF ATC support and flight personnel prepared for the first delivery of Northrop F-5A/B aircraft. Most of the MUSLO team members had previously been assigned to Williams Field, Arizona where the Moroccan pilots and technicians were initially trained.

Starting in the 1960s, the base was called a United States Naval Training Command, and would be called that until it closed in 1977. The base was closed in September–October 1978 and transferred to the RMAF.

== See also ==
- Kenitra Airport
- US Naval Bases North Africa
