= MV Empire Commerce =

World War II merchant ship of the United Kingdom

History
- Name: Empire Commerce
- Owner: Ministry or War Transport
- Operator: Hadley Shipping Co Ltd
- Port of registry: (United Kingdom) Sunderland
- Builder: Sir J Laing & Sons Ltd
- Launched: 23 December 1942
- Completed: March 1943
- Out of service: 1 October 1943
- Identification: Code Letters BFJF; United Kingdom Official Number 169112
- Fate: Torpedoed and sunk

General characteristics
- Class & type: Tanker
- Tonnage: 3,722 GRT; 1,993 NRT
- Length: 343 ft 5 in (104.67 m)
- Beam: 48 ft 3 in (14.71 m)
- Depth: 26 ft 5 in (8.05 m)
- Installed power: 2SCSA diesel engine
- Propulsion: Screw propeller
- Crew: 40 + 7 DEMS gunners

Empire Commerce was a 3,722 GRT tanker that was built in 1942 by Sir J Laing & Sons Ltd, Sunderland for the Ministry of War Transport(MoWT). She entered service in March 1943 and was torpedoed on 1 October 1943 and sunk by U-410.

== Description ==
The ship was built by Sir J Laing & Sons Ltd, Sunderland. She was launched on 29 December 1942 and completed in March 1943.

The ship was 343 feet 5 inches (104.67 m) long, with a beam of 48 feet 3 inches (14.71 m) and a depth of 26 feet 5 inches (8.05 m). She had a GRT of 3,722 and a NRT of 1,993.

The ship was propelled by a 2-stroke Single Cycle Single Acting diesel engine, which had eight cylinders of 23 5/8 inches (60 cm) diameter by 91 5/16 inches (231.9 cm) stroke. The engine was built by William Doxford & Sons Ltd, Sunderland.

== History ==
Empire Commerce was built for the MoWT. She was placed under the management of Hadley Steamship Co Ltd. Her port of registry was Sunderland. The United Kingdom Official Number 169112 and Code Letters BFJF were allocated.

Empire Commerce was a member of a number of convoys during the Second World War.

MKS15

Convoy MKS 15 departed Bizerta, Algeria on 17 June 1943 and arrived at Liverpool on 4 July. It travelled via Gibraltar (departed 23 June). The convoy joined up with Convoy SL 131 at sea on 24 June. Empire Commerce joined the convoy at Bône, Algeria and left it at Oran, Algeria.

MKS19

Convoy MKS 19 departed Tripoli, Libya on 21 July 1943 and arrived at Gibraltar on 28 July. It travelled via Algiers (departed 24 July) and Bizerta, Algeria (departed 26 July). Empire Commerce joined the convoy at Philippeville, Algeria and left it at Algiers.

MKS 26

Convoy MKS 26 departed Alexandria, Egypt on 24 September 1943 and arrived at Liverpool on 17 October. It travelled via Algiers (departed 1 October) and Gibraltar (departed 4 October). The convoy joined with Convoy SL 137 at sea on 4 October. Empire Commerce joined the convoy from Bône, Algeria, bound for Algiers. She was in ballast. On 1 October, she was torpedoed by U-410. Empire Commerce was north west of Philippeville at the time (37°19′N 6°40′E). The ship broke in two, with the stern section sinking. The bow section drifted ashore 8 nautical miles (15 km) east of Philippeville. It was towed to Algiers but had been gutted by fire. All 40 crew and seven DEMS gunners, along with four service personnel who were travelling on board Empire Commerce as passengers were rescued by HMS Alisma and landed at Algiers.
