= HMS Anthony (H40) =

A-class destroyer

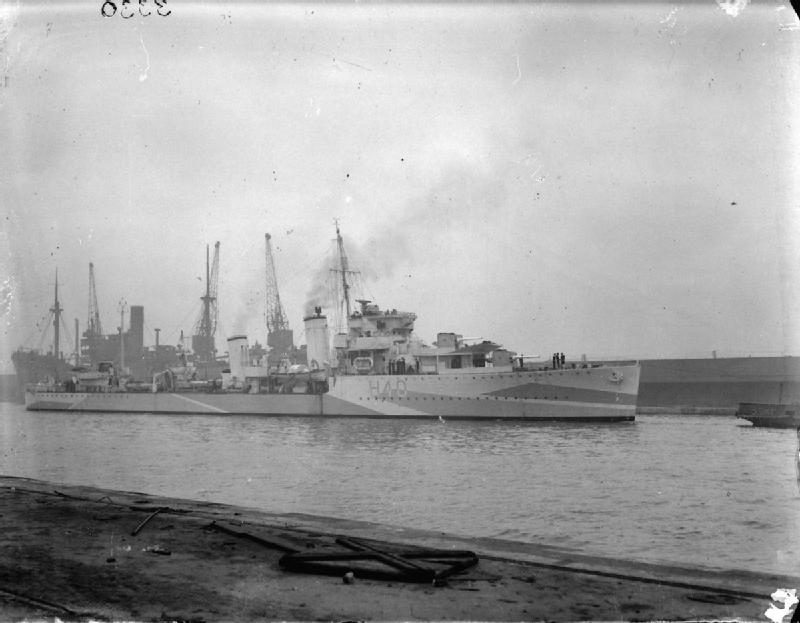
- HMS Anthony in March 1943

History

United Kingdom
- Name: HMS Anthony
- Ordered: 6 March 1928
- Builder: Scotts Shipbuilding and Engineering Company, Greenock, Scotland
- Laid down: 30 July 1928
- Launched: 24 April 1929
- Commissioned: 14 February 1930
- Motto: Portia in Arduia : 'Brave under difficulties'
- Fate: Sold for scrap, 21 February 1948
- Badge: On a Field Black, the head of St Anthony Proper with a White owl and halo Gold.

General characteristics (as built)
- Class & type: A-class destroyer
- Displacement: 1,350 long tons (1,370 t) (standard); 1,773 long tons (1,801 t) (deep load)
- Length: 323 ft (98 m) (o/a)
- Beam: 32 ft 3 in (9.83 m)
- Draught: 12 ft 3 in (3.73 m)
- Installed power: 34,000 shp (25,000 kW); 3 × Yarrow boilers
- Propulsion: 2 × shafts; 2 × geared steam turbines
- Speed: 35 knots (65 km/h; 40 mph)
- Range: 4,800 nmi (8,900 km; 5,500 mi) at 15 knots (28 km/h; 17 mph)
- Complement: 134; 140 (1940)
- Armament: 4 × single 4.7 in (120 mm) guns; 2 × single 2-pdr (40 mm) AA guns; 2 × quadruple 21 in (533 mm) torpedo tubes; 6 × depth charges, 3 chutes

HMS Anthony was an A-class destroyer of the Royal Navy. She served in the Second World War.

== Construction and commissioning ==
Anthony was ordered from Scotts Shipbuilding and Engineering Company, Greenock, Scotland on 6 March 1928 under the 1927 Programme. She was laid down on 30 July 1928, launched on 24 April 1929 and commissioned on 14 February 1930.

== Second World War ==
She was deployed with the 18th Destroyer Flotilla at Portland on the outbreak of war, and served in the English Channel and the South Western Approaches. In November Anthony was transferred to the 23rd Destroyer Flotilla, operating on the East coast. In January 1940 she and her sisters Achates and Arrow escorted the battleship Royal Sovereign part of the way to Halifax. Anthony transferred to Portsmouth in March, joining the 16th Destroyer Flotilla, and in May took part in the Dunkirk evacuation. She eventually rescued 3,000 personnel, but on 30 May she sustained some damage in an air attack and had to remain in port for repairs. She returned to duty with the flotilla in June, now based at Harwich. Assigned to the Home Fleet she carried out convoy escort and anti-submarine duties, moving to join the 12th Destroyer Flotilla at Greenock in September. On 27 September she rescued several survivors from the torpedoed merchant ship City of Benares.

By November Anthony was with the 4th Escort Group, and remained active in the Western Approaches. In February she was damaged in an air raid on the shipping in the River Clyde, but returned to service with the 3rd Destroyer Flotilla in December. She spent the next few months escorting ships involved in minelaying operations, and on 23 May formed part of the escort for the battlecruiser Hood and battleship Prince of Wales as they tracked the German battleship Bismarck. She was detached to refuel at Iceland on 24 May, and so missed the Battle of the Denmark Strait where Hood was sunk, but rejoined Prince of Wales afterwards. Further escort duties followed, with operations off the Norwegian coast in July and August, including participating in Operation Gauntlet, the raid on Spitsbergen on 19 August.

On 29 August Anthony formed part of convoy PQ 1 to Russia, and also covered the returning convoy QP 1 with the tanker Black Ranger. After refitting in the Humber she moved to Gibraltar in January 1942, escorting convoys from the Clyde to Gibraltar and back, and covering warships making deliveries of Spitfires to Malta. In late March she was nominated to join Force H to support Operation Ironclad, the assault on Diego Suarez, Madagascar.

At a crucial moment in Ironclad, the main British landing force was held up west of Diego Suarez by unexpectedly stiff Vichy French resistance. The deadlock was broken when Admiral Syfret dispatched Anthony to dash straight past the harbour defences of Diego Suarez and land 50 Royal Marines in the Vichy rear area. The Marines created "disturbance in the town out of all proportion to their numbers"; the Vichy defence was soon broken. Diego Suarez was surrendered on 7 May.

The operation was concluded successfully in May, after which Anthony remained in the Mediterranean. In September she escorted Royal Sovereign to the United States, returning to European waters in October as an escort for troop convoys for Operation Torch (the invasion of French North Africa). Anthony was refitted in late 1942, and deployed with the 13th Destroyer Flotilla in early 1943, spending the first half of the year escorting convoys along the West African coast and in the Western Mediterranean. She supported the Allied invasion of Sicily in July, and spent the rest of the year escorting convoys in the Mediterranean. On 24 February 1944 she, Wishart, aircraft from No. 202 Squadron RAF and the US Navy sank the German submarine U-761 west of Gibraltar. Anthony returned to Britain in September, escorting convoys in the Western Approaches and the English Channel. On 24 December 1944 she and Brilliant were escorting the troopship Leopoldville, when Leopoldville was torpedoed and sunk by U-486 with heavy loss of life.

In early 1945 Anthony was converted into an air target ship, to train new aircrew in warship identification, and methods of attack. She fulfilled this role for the rest of the war, and until January 1946.

== Postwar and disposal ==
Anthony was reduced to the reserve on 27 March 1946, and put up for disposal. She was reactivated in September however, and used for damage control trials until February 1948. She was sold for scrap on 21 February, and was towed to BISCO's breaking yard at Troon, Ayrshire in May 1948.
