= HMS Wishart =

Destroyer of the Royal Navy

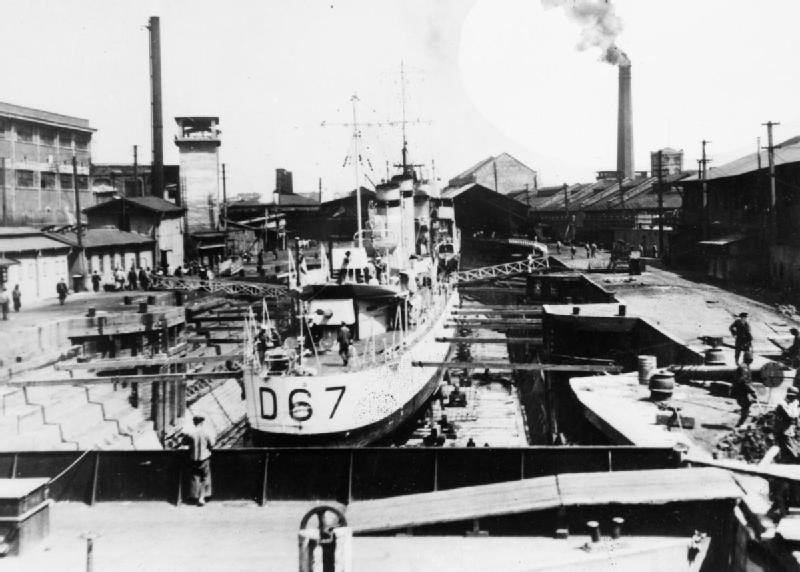
- HMS Wishart in drydock sometime prior to World War II.

History

United Kingdom
- Name: HMS Wishart
- Namesake: James Wishart (1659–1723), British admiral who was commanding officer of HMS Swiftsure at the Battle of Vigo Bay in 1702
- Ordered: January 1918
- Builder: John I. Thornycroft & Company, Woolston, Hampshire, Hampshire
- Laid down: 18 May 1918
- Launched: 18 July 1919
- Completed: June 1920
- Commissioned: June 1920
- Decommissioned: February 1945
- Motto: Clementia victis ("Mercy to the vanquished")
- Fate: Sold for scrapping 20 March 1945
- Badge: A red pheon on a silver field

General characteristics
- Displacement: 1,140 tons standard, 1,550 tons full
- Length: 300 ft (91.4 m) o/a; 312 ft (95.1 m) p/p
- Beam: 30 ft (9.1 m)
- Draught: 10 ft 11 in (3.33 m)
- Propulsion: 3 Yarrow type Water-tube boilers, Brown-Curtis steam turbines, 2 shafts, 27,000 shp
- Speed: 34 kn (63 km/h); Reduced to 25 kn (46 km/h) 1943
- Range: 320–370 tons oil; 3,500 nmi (6,480 km) at 15 kn (28 km/h); 900 nmi (1,670 km) at 32 kn (59 km/h)
- Complement: 134
- Sensors & processing systems: Type 271 surface warning radar fitted 1942
- Armament: 4 × BL 4.7 in (120-mm) Mk.I guns mount P Mk.I; 2 × QF 2 pdr Mk.II "pom-pom" (40 mm L/39); 6 × 21-inch Torpedo Tubes
- Notes: Pennant number D67

HMS Wishart (D67) was a Modified W-class destroyer of the British Royal Navy that saw service in World War II. She spent most of her wartime career based at Gibraltar, engaged in convoy defence, but also served in various naval and military operations in the Mediterranean Sea.

== Construction and commissioning ==
Wishart, the first Royal Navy ship of the name, was ordered in January 1918 as part of the 13th Order of the 1918–1919 Naval Programme, and was laid down on 18 May 1918 by John I. Thornycroft & Company at Woolston, Hampshire. The pace of her construction slowed after the Armistice with Germany brought World War I to an end on 11 November 1918, but she was launched on 18 July 1919 and completed in June 1920.

== Service history ==
=== Interwar ===
Upon completion, Wishart was commissioned in June 1920. During the interwar period she served first in the Atlantic Fleet and then in the Mediterranean Fleet, and while in the latter had Lord Louis Mountbatten as her commanding officer for a time.

Wishart was in waters off China when the United States Navy gunboat USS Fulton (PG-49) was heavily damaged by fire while at sea on 14 March 1934. Wishart and the merchant ship SS Tsinan took off Fulton's crew, three of whom had suffered minor injuries, and took them to the Royal Navy Dockyard at Hong Kong, and Wishart's sister ship Whitshed stood by Fulton until a salvage party could put the fire out. The United States Department of the Navy later passed thanks to British naval authorities for the assistance Wishart and Whitshed provided to Fulton and her crew.

=== World War II ===
==== 1939–1940 ====
When the United Kingdom entered World War II in September 1939, Wishart was stationed at Gibraltar, tasked with contraband control duties and trade defence in the Mediterranean Sea and North Atlantic Ocean. On 27 December 1939 she intercepted the German merchant ship Glickburg, and Glickburg's crew ran their ship aground on the coast of Spain near the Chipiona Light at Chipiona. On 29 December 1939, Wishart and the destroyer Active departed Gibraltar with Convoy HG 13F, bound for Liverpool, remaining with the convoy as its escort until detaching on 3 January 1940 to return to Gibraltar.

On 1 February 1940, Wishart and the destroyer Velox escorted Convoy OG 16F on the first leg of its voyage to the United Kingdom. Wishart also escorted Convoy OG 18 on the first segment of its voyage when it departed Gibraltar on 4 February 1940, detaching to return to Gibraltar on 5 February 1940. On 14 February 1940, she rendezvoused with Convoy HG 19F, escorted by two French Navy destroyers, and escorted it to Gibraltar, where it arrived on 18 February 1940. On 25 February 1940, Wishart and the sloops Aberdeen and Deptford departed Gibraltar as the escort of Convoy OG 19F on the first leg of its voyage to Liverpool, detaching on 27 February 1940 and returning to Gibraltar.

From 14 to 17 March 1940, Wishart and the destroyer Winchelsea joined two French destroyers in escorting Convoy OG 21 on the first leg of its voyage from Gibraltar to Liverpool. From 21 to 24 March 1940, Wishart again joined two French destroyers as escort for Convoy OG 22 during the first segment of its voyage from Gibraltar to Liverpool. In April 1940, she performed similar duties, joining the destroyers Vortigern and Watchman as the escort for Convoy OG24 from its departure from Gibraltar on 2 April until 4 April, and joining Aberdeen and the destroyer Vimy in escorting Convoy OG 25F during the first portion of its voyage from Gibraltar from 9 until 12 April.

Wishart continued her convoy escort and patrol activities until 31 July 1940, when she became part of the escort for Force H units covering the aircraft carrier Argus as Argus delivered aircraft to Malta in Operation Hurry. Wishart then remained with Force H as the aircraft carrier Ark Royal launched airstrikes against Italian airfields at Cagliari on Sardinia on 2 August 1940. At the end of August 1940, she again operated with Force H, forming part of the screen on 30 August 1940 for the battleship Valiant, the aircraft carrier Illustrious, and the light cruisers Calcutta and Coventry, which were steaming to Alexandria, Egypt, to reinforce the Mediterranean Fleet in Operation Hats, and detaching on 31 August 1940 along with Velox to transmit radio signals in an attempt to confuse Italian listening stations as to the heading of the other ships.

In September 1940, Wishart returned to her convoy duties at Gibraltar, but she returned to Force H on 7 November 1940 as part of the escort for forces covering the passage of the battleship Barham, the heavy cruiser Berwick, the light cruiser Glasgow, and the destroyers Encounter, Gallant, Greyhound, and Griffin during their passage to Alexandria, Egypt, to reinforce the Mediterranean Fleet there in Operation Coat. She again left her convoy duties on 15 November 1940 to participate in Operation White, escorting Force H forces covering Argus while she delivered more aircraft to Malta. On 24 November 1940, Wishart and the destroyers Encounter, Duncan, and Vidette of the 13th Destroyer Flotilla began operations with Force H, joining Force H ships – Ark Royal, the battlecruiser Renown, the light cruiser Despatch, and the destroyers Faulknor, Firedrake, Forester, Fury, Kelvin, and Jaguar – covering a convoy and reinforcements bound from Gibraltar to Alexandria in Operation Collar. On 27 November 1940, aircraft sighted heavy units of the Italian battlefleet at sea attempting to intercept the convoy, and the other ships detached to engage the Italians – resulting in the Battle of Cape Spartivento, a brief exchange of gunfire before the Italian fleet returned to base – while Wishart and Vidette remained behind to protect the convoy.

On 20 December 1940, Wishart again left her routine duties to operate with Force H in Operation Hide, covering a convoy of empty merchant ships, the battleship Malaya, and the destroyers Hereward and Hero as it steamed from Malta to Gibraltar.

==== 1941 ====
Wishart spent the first quarter of 1941 operating on North Atlantic convoy duty from Gibraltar. In March 1941, the Royal Navy selected her for transfer to local convoy escort duty at Freetown in Sierra Leone. Accordingly, she departed Gibraltar on 2 April 1941 as part of the escort for Convoy WS 7 bound for Freetown, and remained there after the convoy arrived on 4 April. On 7 April 1941, she rejoined WS 7 when it departed Freetown on the next leg of its voyage, forming part of its escort with the destroyers Foxhound and Vidette until detaching from the convoy on 9 April 1940 to return to Freetown. Later in April, she rescued 41 survivors of the British merchant ship St. Helena, which the German submarine U-124 had sunk on 12 April 1941 about 100 nautical miles (185 km) southwest of Freetown at 07°50′00″N 014°00′00″W. From 5 to 9 May 1941 she joined Duncan in providing local escort for Convoy WS 8A during the final segment of its voyage to Freetown, after which she joined Duncan and the destroyers Boreas and Highlander in escorting the convoy from its departure on 14 May on the next leg of its journey until she and Boreas detached to return to Freetown the following day.

In June 1941, Wishart returned to Gibraltar to resume her convoy escort duties there. On 13 June 1941 she was detached for duty with Force H, escorting a force covering the delivery of aircraft to Malta by the aircraft carriers Ark Royal and Victorious in Operation Tracer. She again was selected for duty with Force H on 26 June 1941 for another Malta aircraft delivery operation, but she quickly was replaced in this duty by the destroyer Lance and remained on duty at Gibraltar instead. On 27 June 1941, she sank the Italian submarine Glauco in the North Atlantic west of Gibraltar at 35°00′00″N 012°41′00″W.

In July 1941, Wishart returned to the United Kingdom for refit and conversion into a long-range escort, and she was in shipyard hands for the rest of the year.

==== 1942 ====
Upon completing her refit and conversion, Wishart passed her acceptance trials in January 1942 and in February 1942 – the month in which the civil community of Port Talbot, Glamorgan, Wales, "adopted" her as the result of a Warship Week National Savings campaign – proceeded to Gibraltar. In March 1942, she resumed her convoy escort duties there.

On 20 March 1942, Wishart detached from those duties to operate with Force H in Operation Picket I, joining Malaya, the light cruiser Hermione, and the destroyers Active, Anthony, Blankney, Croome, Duncan, Exmoor, and Whitehall in covering the aircraft carriers Argus and Eagle as the latter ships delivered aircraft to Malta. On 27 March 1942, she detached from her normal duties again to participate with the same ships in Operation Picket II, another such aircraft delivery. On 19 April 1942, she detached from her convoy duties to take part with the British 3rd and 13th Destroyer Flotillas and two United States Navy destroyers in escorting Renown and the light cruisers Cairo and Charybdis as they covered the U.S. Navy aircraft carrier USS Wasp while she delivered aircraft to Malta in Operation Calendar.

Wishart, the destroyer Wrestler, and aircraft of the Royal Air Force's No. 202 Squadron sank the German submarine U-74 with all hands east of Cartagena, Spain, in a depth-charge attack at position 37°16′00″N 000°01′00″E on 2 May 1942. On 8 May 1942, she detached for duty with Force H, joining destroyers of the 13th Destroyer Flotilla in escorting Renown, Charybdis, Eagle, and Wasp as Eagle and Wasp delivered aircraft to Malta in Operation Bowery. She again detached on 18 May 1942 to operate with Force H, providing the escort along with Charybdis and the destroyers Antelope, Ithuriel, Partridge, Vidette, Westcott, and Wrestler for Argus and Eagle as they delivered aircraft to Malta in Operation LB. Her assignment to Force H continued into June, and she began a deployment in support of Operation Style on 2 June 1942, joining Charybdis, Antelope, Ithuriel, Partridge, and Westcott in covering Eagle as she delivered aircraft to Malta. On 8 June, Wishart began another such operation, Operation Salient, this time participating in a covering force consisting of Cairo, Wrestler, and the ships which had taken part in Operation Style as Eagle again delivered aircraft to Malta. On 11 June, she joined Force W to take part in Operation Harpoon, joining Malaya, Argus, Eagle, Charybdis, Antelope, Vidette, Westcott, Wrestler, the light cruisers Kenya and Liverpool, the destroyer leader Onslow, and the destroyers Escapade and Icarus in covering a Malta-bound convoy as far as the Sicilian Narrows.

Wishart returned to convoy escort duties at Gibraltar on 18 June 1942. On 26 June she joined Convoy WS 20 and was detached to escort the merchant ship SS Narkunda into Gibraltar. She continued on such duties until 10 August 1942, when she again detached from them to take part in Operation Pedestal as a part of Force Z, supporting another Malta-bound convoy by joining Antelope, Ithuriel, and the destroyers Laforey, Lightning, and Lookout as the screen for the convoy's covering force, consisting of the aircraft carriers Eagle, Indomitable, and Victorious, the battleships Nelson and Rodney, and the light cruisers Charybdis, Phoebe and Sirius. When the convoy reached the Skerki Banks in the central Mediterranean on 13 August 1942, she and the rest of Force Z detached and returned to Gibraltar, where Wishart resumed routine convoy escort duty. She again left these duties on 28 October 1942 to take part in Operation Train, joining the light cruiser Aurora and the destroyers Achates, Bramham, Cowdray, Vanoc, Verity, and Westcott and the Polish Navy destroyer ORP Błyskawica in covering the aircraft carrier Furious as Furious made the final aircraft delivery run to Malta.

In November 1942, Wishart was assigned to duty escorting military convoys in the North Atlantic and Mediterranean carrying troops and supplies for Operation Torch, the Allied invasion of French North Africa. On 7 November, she, Velox, and the frigate Spey joined the escort of an assault convoy bound for North Africa for the invasion and detached to stand by the U.S. Navy attack transport USS Thomas Stone after an Axis submarine torpedoed Thomas Stone; after the troops had disembarked into landing craft or been taken aboard Spey, Wishart escorted Thomas Stone while a tug towed her to Algiers in Algeria for repairs. On 21 December 1942, Wishart assisted in search-and-rescue operations after the German submarine U-562 torpedoed and sank the troop transport MV Strathallan in the Mediterranean at 36°52′00″N 000°34′00″W, killing 16 of those aboard and leaving 5,106 survivors.

==== 1943–1945 ====
During the first half of 1943, Wishart continued her convoy escort duties at Gibraltar but also supported Allied military operations ashore in North Africa. On 19 May 1943 she mistook the Free French Naval Forces submarine La Vestal for a German U-boat in darkness in the Mediterranean Sea and attacked her. La Vestal lost a large portion of her stern and suffered one killed and several wounded. La Vestal was towed into port and repaired.

In July 1943, Wishart was assigned to support Operation Husky, the Allied invasion of Sicily, and was present during the amphibious landings southwest of Syracuse on 10 July 1943, the first day of the invasion. For the rest of 1943, she was deployed for convoy defence in the western and central Mediterranean.

In January 1944, Wishart was deployed for convoy escort duty at Gibraltar. On 24 February 1944, after a U.S. Navy PBY Catalina aircraft of Patrol Squadron 63 using magnetic anomaly detection equipment detected the German submarine U-761 near Tangier while U-761 was attempting to transit the Strait of Gibraltar, a U.S. Navy PV Ventura aircraft of Bombing Squadron 127 and a British Catalina of the Royal Air Force's No. 202 Squadron attacked the submarine and forced her to surface. Wishart and Anthony then approached U-761, and the submarine scuttled herself within sight of the destroyers, suffering nine dead. Wishart and Anthony captured her 48 survivors.

Wishart remained on convoy defence duty at Gibraltar until January 1945, when the Royal Navy decided to withdraw her from service and she steamed to the United Kingdom for deactivation.

== Decommissioning and disposal ==
Wishart was decommissioned in February 1945. On 20 March 1945, she was sold for scrapping by Thos. W. Ward at Inverkeithing, Scotland. The ship arrived at the shipbreaker's yard under tow sometime after the armistice with Japan brought World War II to a close on 15 August 1945.

== Bibliography ==
- Campbell, John (1985). Naval Weapons of World War II. Annapolis, Maryland: Naval Institute Press. ISBN 0-87021-459-4.
- Chesneau, Roger, ed. (1980). Conway's All the World's Fighting Ships 1922–1946. Greenwich, UK: Conway Maritime Press. ISBN 0-85177-146-7.
- Colledge, J. J.; Warlow, Ben (2006) [1969]. Ships of the Royal Navy: The Complete Record of All Fighting Ships of the Royal Navy from the 15th Century to the Present (3rd Rev ed.). London: Chatham Publishing. ISBN 978-1-86176-281-8. OCLC 67375475.
- Cocker, Maurice. Destroyers of the Royal Navy, 1893–1981. Ian Allan. ISBN 0-7110-1075-7.
- Friedman, Norman (2009). British Destroyers From Earliest Days to the Second World War. Annapolis, Maryland: Naval Institute Press. ISBN 978-1-59114-081-8.
- Gardiner, Robert & Gray, Randal, eds. (1985). Conway's All the World's Fighting Ships 1906–1921. Annapolis, Maryland: Naval Institute Press. ISBN 0-85177-245-5.
- Lenton, H. T. (1998). British & Empire Warships of the Second World War. Annapolis, Maryland: Naval Institute Press. ISBN 1-55750-048-7.
- March, Edgar J. (1966). British Destroyers: A History of Development, 1892–1953; Drawn by Admiralty Permission From Official Records & Returns, Ships' Covers & Building Plans. London: Seeley Service. OCLC 164893555.
- Preston, Antony (1971). 'V & W' Class Destroyers 1917–1945. London: Macdonald. OCLC 464542895.
- Raven, Alan & Roberts, John (1979). 'V' and 'W' Class Destroyers. Man o'War. Vol. 2. London: Arms & Armour. ISBN 0-85368-233-X.
- Rohwer, Jürgen (2005). Chronology of the War at Sea 1939–1945: The Naval History of World War Two (Third Revised ed.). Annapolis, Maryland: Naval Institute Press. ISBN 1-59114-119-2.
- Whinney, Bob (2000). The U-boat Peril: A Fight for Survival. Cassell. ISBN 0-304-35132-6.
- Whitley, M. J. (1988). Destroyers of World War 2. Annapolis, Maryland: Naval Institute Press. ISBN 0-87021-326-1.
- Winser, John de D. (1999). B.E.F. Ships Before, At and After Dunkirk. Gravesend, Kent: World Ship Society. ISBN 0-905617-91-6.
