= USS Baker (DE-190) =

Cannon-class destroyer escort

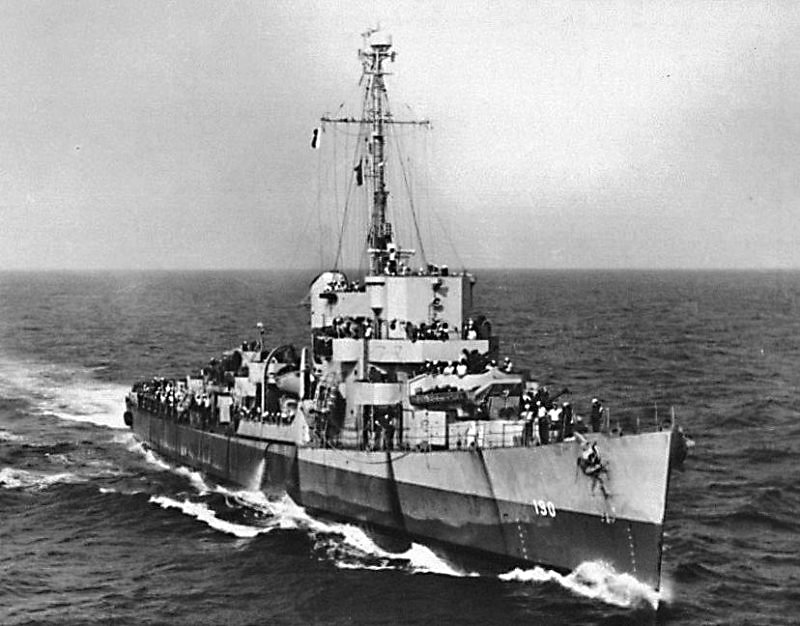
- Escort Destroyer USS Baker (DE-190)

History

United States
- Name: USS Baker (DE-190)
- Namesake: John Drayton Baker
- Builder: Federal Shipbuilding and Drydock Company, Newark, New Jersey
- Laid down: 9 September 1943
- Launched: 28 November 1943
- Commissioned: 23 December 1943
- Decommissioned: 4 March 1946
- Stricken: 18 April 1952
- Honors and awards: 1 battle star for World War II
- Fate: Transferred to France, 29 March 1952
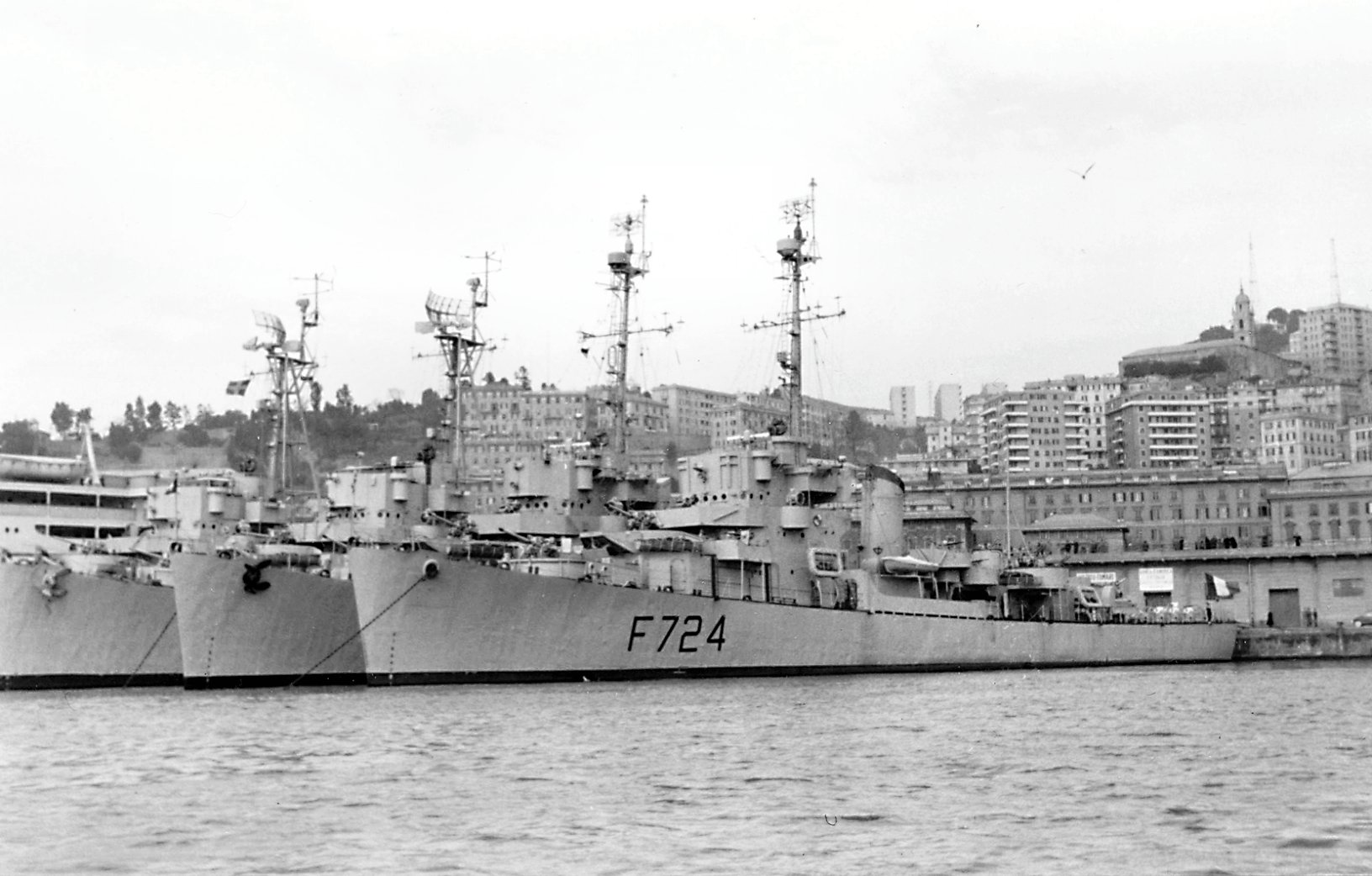
- French Frigate Malgache (F724)

History

France
- Name: Malgache (F724)
- Namesake: Malagasy people
- Acquired: 29 March 1952
- Decommissioned: 1 January 1969
- Fate: Sunk as a target, 1970

General characteristics
- Class & type: Cannon-class destroyer escort
- Displacement: 1,240 long tons (1,260 t) standard; 1,620 long tons (1,646 t) full
- Length: 306 ft (93 m) o/a; 300 ft (91 m) w/l
- Beam: 36 ft 10 in (11.23 m)
- Draft: 11 ft 8 in (3.56 m)
- Propulsion: 4 × GM Mod. 16-278A diesel engines with electric drive, 6,000 shp (4,474 kW), 2 screws
- Speed: 21 knots (39 km/h; 24 mph)
- Range: 10,800 nmi (20,000 km) at 12 kn (22 km/h; 14 mph)
- Complement: 15 officers and 201 enlisted
- Armament: 3 × single Mk.22 3-inch/50-caliber guns; 1 × twin 40 mm Mk.1 AA gun; 8 × 20 mm Mk.4 AA guns; 3 × 21 inch (533 mm) torpedo tubes; 1 × Hedgehog Mk.10 anti-submarine mortar (144 rounds); 8 × Mk.6 depth charge projectors; 2 × Mk.9 depth charge tracks

USS Baker (DE-190) was a Cannon-class destroyer escort built for the United States Navy during World War II. She served in the Atlantic Ocean and provided escort service against submarine and air attack for Navy vessels and convoys. She returned home at war's end with a one battle star for her assistance in sinking a German submarine.

Baker was named after Ensign John Drayton Baker who was awarded a Navy Cross posthumously after the Battle of Coral Sea.

== Namesake ==
John Drayton Baker was born on 31 May 1915 in Plainfield, New Jersey. He enlisted in the U.S. Naval Reserve as Seaman 2d class on 21 January 1941 at Brooklyn, New York. After flight instruction at Miami and Jacksonville, Florida, he was appointed naval aviator on 26 August 1941 and received a reserve ensign's commission on 18 September. He joined VF-42 on 8 December 1941 aboard the aircraft carrier USS Yorktown. Baker received a Navy Cross, posthumously, for his achievements during the Battle of the Coral Sea.

== Commissioning ==
The ship was laid down on 9 September 1943 at Port Newark, New Jersey, by the Federal Shipbuilding & Drydock Co.; launched on 28 November 1943; sponsored by Mrs. Margaret Baker, the mother of Ens. Baker; and commissioned at the New York Navy Yard on 23 December 1943.

== World War II Atlantic Ocean operations ==
After fitting out at her builders' yard, running the required trials in Long Island Sound, and undergoing a final check, the new destroyer escort departed the New York Navy Yard on 9 January 1944 for shakedown training. Following these drills and exercises that she conducted off Bermuda with friendly submarines, she returned to New York on 4 February.

Baker's first convoy escort cycle proved uneventful. Sailing from New York to Hampton Roads on 11 and 12 February, she set out for French Morocco the following day and arrived at Casablanca on 3 March. Upon her return to New York on 24 March, the ship underwent a week long overhaul before carrying out antisubmarine warfare (ASW) training at Casco Bay, Maine. Assigned to Escort Division (CortDiv) 48, she returned to Hampton Roads.

=== Sinking of German submarine U-616 ===
Her second voyage to North Africa proved to be quiet, and Baker reached Bizerte, Tunisia, with her convoy on 30 April. She commenced her passage back to New York with convoy UGS 39 on 11 May, but a German submarine enlivened the return trip. On 14 May, before the convoy cleared the Mediterranean, U-616 torpedoed two merchantmen, SS G. S. Walden and SS Fort Fidler. Each managed to limp into port for repairs, although their assailant, U-616, soon fell victim to the combined efforts of eight American destroyers and several British aircraft.

After post voyage upkeep at the New York Navy Yard early in June and ensuing ASW exercises at Casco Bay, Baker sailed for Hampton Roads as part of a "hunter killer" group, Task Group (TG) 22.10, formed around the escort carrier Card (CVE-11). Departing Casco Bay on 20 June, the task group reached Hampton Roads on the 22d, and cleared the Virginia Capes on the 25th. Following exercises at Bermuda, TG 22.10 proceeded on its appointed mission. On 2 July, its air patrol sighted a surfaced U-boat, but her lookouts must have spotted the planes because a search by two escorts dispatched proved to be fruitless.

=== Attack on a German submarine ===
While hunting south of Newfoundland on 5 July, Baker picked up a submarine on her sound gear at 1907, and carried out a depth charge attack. The force of the explosions, however, rendered the training mechanism on her sound gear inoperable and three men had to go below to turn the gear manually. Baker again located the submarine and delivered another depth charge attack, blowing the enemy to the surface. Her guns opened fire at 1,200 yards as soon as the submarine broke the surface. The destroyer escort's crew observed hits on the submarine and splashes close aboard. As Baker came left and steadied, all guns except the starboard 20 millimeters kept up a "heavy and accurate" fire. Two torpedoes fired by the destroyer escort hit the U-boat but failed to detonate due to the short run. As Baker passed close ahead of the submarine, she then laid a full 13 charge pattern squarely in the path of the enemy. The charges exploded, catching the U-boat in the midst of them.

=== Sinking of the German submarine U-233 ===
Nearby, Thomas (DE-102), the division flagship, observed that Baker's depth charge attacks and gunnery had been effective because smoke and flame issued from the conning tower. Thomas joined the action with her forward three-inch guns at 8,000 yards, firing 29 rounds as she closed. She delivered the coup de grâce by ramming the U-boat's starboard side some 20 to 30 feet abaft the conning tower. After a 70 degree roll to port, the submarine wallowed in the swell. At 1947, her bow rose high out of the water, and she then slid back into the sea at an angle of 60°. Baker rescued 31 survivors, one of whom was the U-boat commander, Oberleutnant Hans Steen, who died the following day from shrapnel wounds. The submarine damaged by Baker and sunk by Thomas proved to be the 1,600 ton minelayer, U-233.

Putting into Boston on 7 July, TG 22.10 turned over its prisoners and provisioned, before getting under way again on the 10th to resume its "hunter killer" operations. Reaching San Juan, Puerto Rico, on 18 July, the task group rested there until the 24th. Baker then cruised as far east as the Azores before returning to New York on 25 August. After voyage repairs at the Navy Yard Annex, Bayonne, New Jersey, from 25 August to 7 September, the destroyer escort honed her ASW skills at Casco Bay before proceeding to Hampton Roads along with the rest of CortDiv 48. A tropical hurricane enlivened the passage to the Virginia Capes but caused no appreciable damage on board.

=== New Year's Day in New York City ===
The warship departed for Bermuda on 18 September and arrived there two days later for five days of ASW exercises. She then set out for some hunter-killer operations that proved uneventful. Baker returned to the New York Navy Yard on 5 November and, after repairs there, she again exercised in Casco Bay before participating in exercises in the waters off Bermuda. After returning to New York on New Year's Eve, Baker operated out of Newport, Rhode Island, from 4 to 21 January 1945, serving as plane guard for escort carrier Prince William (CVE-31) as she conducted pilot qualifications. Detached on the 22d, the destroyer escort returned to the New York Navy Yard where she spent the remainder of January and the first few days of February. Baker then escorted Card from the Delaware Breakwater to New York before heading south toward Hampton Roads.

Assigned to a "hunter killer" group formed around escort carrier Bogue (CVE-9), Baker sailed from Norfolk, Virginia, on 8 February. This task group, TG 22.3, merged with TG 22.4 eight days later and the two groups patrolled as far as Iceland, frequently groping through heavy snow and rain squalls. The suspicion that U-boats were operating in the vicinity prompted the groups to investigate each contact thoroughly. However, several "likely" contacts proved to be negative.

=== Damaged in North Atlantic storms ===
Although the group did not meet any U-boats, on 23 February it did encounter a storm of terrible ferocity, whipped by winds clocked at 115 knots. Baker sustained heavy, but not critical, damage: sprung frames, ruptured steam lines, downed lifelines, shorted out fire control circuits, and inoperable sound gear. Baker, and the rest of CortDiv 48, subsequently anchored in Reykjavík Harbor, Iceland, to repair the damage.

=== Sinking German submarine U-548 ===
Returning to the New York Navy Yard on 17 March, she spent a week there undergoing voyage repairs and receiving upkeep before shifting to New London, Connecticut, for operations out of that port with friendly submarines until 14 April when she received orders to proceed to the Virginia Capes to deal with U-boats operating nearby. One of these, U-548, torpedoed two merchantmen, USS Swiftscout on 18 April and SS Katy on the 23rd, but eventually ran afoul of three of Baker's division mates — Thomas, Bostwick (DE-103), and Coffman (DE-191), and the frigate Natchez (PF-2) - and was sunk off the Virginia coast on 30 April.

=== Celebrating the end of the war with Germany ===
After the end of the war with Germany, Baker operated out of Quonset Point, Rhode Island, as plane guard for escort carriers Card and Croatan (CVE-25) as they qualified pilots, carrying out that duty through September. She participated in the big Navy Day observances at New York City on 27 October; anchored in the Hudson River above the George Washington Bridge, she fired a 21 gun salute to President Harry S. Truman, who was embarked in Renshaw (DD-499) to review the assembled fleet.

Going into the New York Naval Shipyard the next day for repairs, Baker cleared the yard for Quonset Point on the 31st, to resume her plane guard occupation, but soon received orders re-routing her to New London, Connecticut. There, she joined U-977, which after the surrender of Germany, had made a 10-week submerged voyage to Argentina where she was turned over to the Argentines on 17 August 1945. Over the next few weeks, Baker and U-977 visited Albany, Poughkeepsie, and Newburgh, New York; Wilmington and Lewes, Delaware; Richmond, Virginia; and Washington, D.C., affording the American public in those places an opportunity to see a German U-boat and a destroyer escort to stimulate interest in the Victory Loan fund raising drive, winding up the tour at the nation's capital on 8 December 1945.

== Post-war decommissioning ==
Decommissioned on 4 March 1946, Baker was placed in reserve at Green Cove Springs, Florida, where she remained until turned over to the French Government under the Mutual Defense Aid Program (MDAP) on 29 March 1952. Her name was struck from the Navy list on 18 April 1952. Renamed Malgache (F.724), the ship served under the Tricolor until decommissioned on 1 January 1969. The warship was sunk as a target by U.S. 6th Fleet units sometime during 1970.

== Awards ==
Baker (DE-190) earned one battle star for her World War II service, in assisting in the destruction of U-233.

== See also ==
- List of escorteurs of France
