= USS Bronstein (DE-189) =

Cannon-class destroyer escort

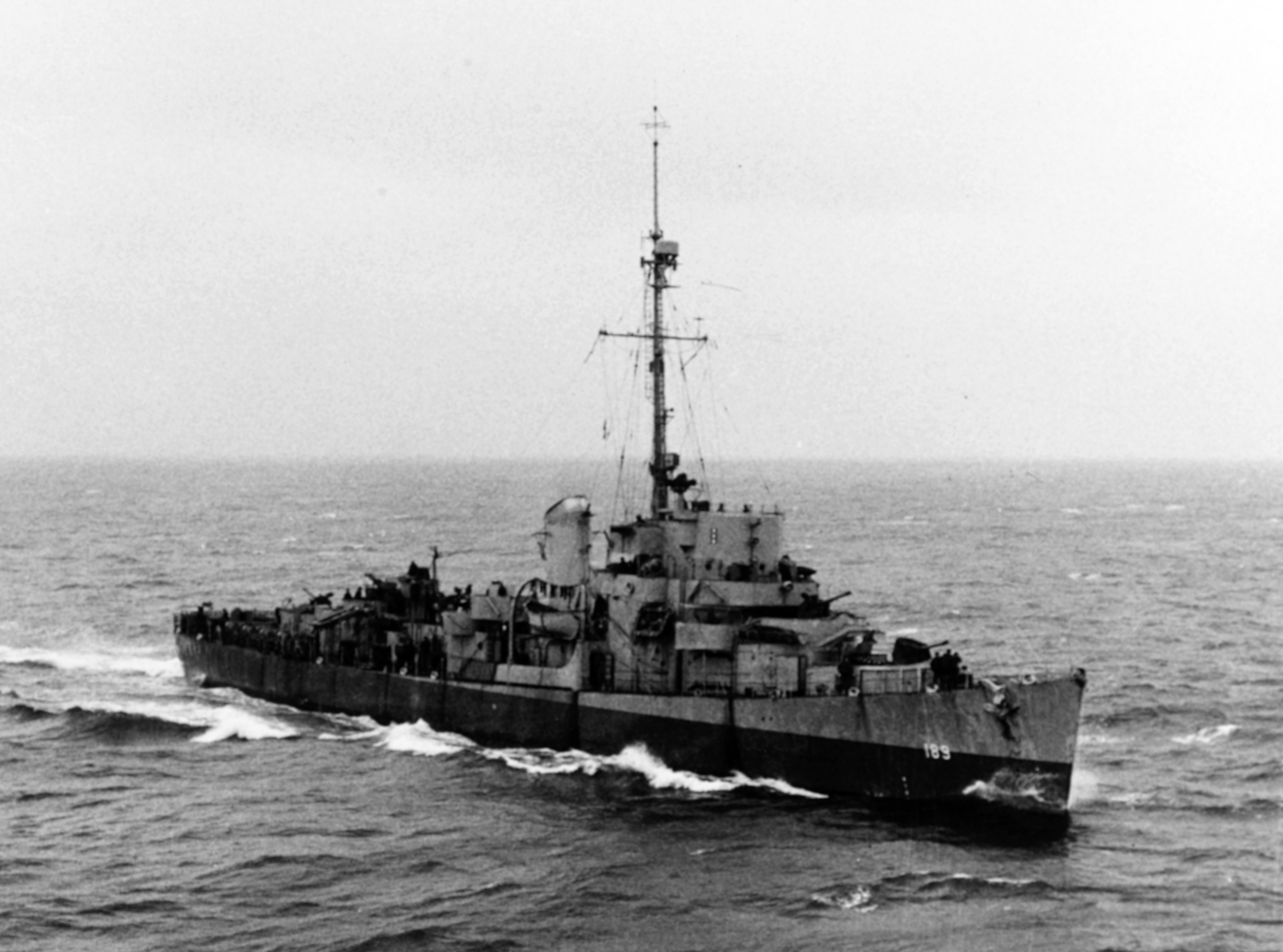

History

United States
- Name: USS Bronstein
- Namesake: Ben Richard Bronstein
- Builder: Federal Shipbuilding and Drydock Company, Newark, New Jersey
- Laid down: 26 August 1943
- Launched: 14 November 1943
- Commissioned: 13 December 1943
- Decommissioned: 5 November 1945
- Stricken: 14 May 1952
- Honors and awards: 3 battle stars (World War II)
- Fate: Sold to Uruguay, 3 May 1952

Uruguay
- Name: ROU Artigas (DE-2)
- Acquired: 3 May 1952
- Fate: Broken up, 1988

General characteristics
- Class & type: Cannon-class destroyer escort
- Displacement: 1,240 long tons (1,260 t) standard; 1,620 long tons (1,646 t) full
- Length: 306 ft (93 m) o/a; 300 ft (91 m) w/l
- Beam: 36 ft 10 in (11.23 m)
- Draft: 11 ft 8 in (3.56 m)
- Propulsion: 4 × GM Mod. 16-278A diesel engines with electric drive, 6,000 shp (4,474 kW), 2 screws
- Speed: 21 knots (39 km/h; 24 mph)
- Range: 10,800 nmi (20,000 km) at 12 kn (22 km/h; 14 mph)
- Complement: 15 officers and 201 enlisted
- Armament: 3 × single Mk.22 3"/50 caliber guns; 1 × twin 40 mm Mk.1 AA gun; 8 × 20 mm Mk.4 AA guns; 3 × 21 inch (533 mm) torpedo tubes; 1 × Hedgehog Mk.10 anti-submarine mortar (144 rounds); 8 × Mk.6 depth charge projectors; 2 × Mk.9 depth charge tracks

USS Bronstein (DE-189) was a Cannon-class destroyer escort in service with the United States Navy from 1943 to 1945. In 1952, she was sold to Uruguay, where she served as ROU Artigas (DE-2) until being decommissioned and scrapped in 1988.

== History ==
=== United States Navy (1943-1952) ===
USS Bronstein was named in honor of Ben Richard Bronstein, Assistant Surgeon, who was killed in action 28 February 1942 when Jacob Jones (DD-130) was sunk by an enemy submarine off Cape May, New Jersey. The ship was laid down on 26 August 1943 at Kearny, New Jersey, by the Federal Shipbuilding and Drydock Company, Port Newark, New Jersey; launched on 14 November 1943; sponsored by Mrs. Dina Bronstein Kurtz, the mother of Lt.(jg.) Bronstein; and commissioned on 13 December 1943.

==== Battle of the Atlantic ====
Following shakedown exercises off Bermuda in January 1944, the destroyer escort sailed to Norfolk, Virginia, where she was assigned to Task Group (TG) 21.16, an anti-submarine hunter-killer group composed of carrier Block Island (CVE-21), destroyer Corry (DD-463), and destroyer escorts Bronstein, Thomas (DE-102), Breeman (DE-104), and Bostwick (DE-103). On 16 February, the group left Norfolk for patrol in the North Atlantic.

After initially conducting a futile search for a Japanese submarine reported to be operating between Bermuda and the Azores, the group turned its attention to a wolf pack of about nine German submarines. Task Group 21.16 made numerous attacks on the pack; and, on the evening of the 29th, Thomas made a surface radar contact, and Bostwick joined her in the search to identify the contact. Meanwhile, Block Island had detached Bronstein to search for a second suspected U-boat; and, while the destroyer escort hunted the new enemy, one of her star shells revealed U-709 on the surface preparing to attack Thomas and Bostwick. Bronstein opened fire, and her guns registered several hits. The submarine went deep to escape, and the three destroyer escorts attacked her with depth charges. Thomas finally sank U-709 early the next morning.

As the second U-boat stealthily maneuvered to attack Block Island, Bronstein made sonar contact on her and immediately began dropping depth charges. After only an hour's work, the warship's crew received the reward of a tremendous explosion that could only have been the end of the submarine, later identified as U-603. The hunter-killer group put into Casablanca on 8 March for voyage repairs and refueling.

Departing the Moroccan coast on the 11th, the Block Island group made radar contact four days later with U-801. The submarine surfaced on the evening of 16 March only to be attacked by aircraft from the carrier. The U-boat dived and managed to evade the hunters until the early hours of the 17th, when the German skipper erred and sent a radio message. Corry ran down the bearing of the transmission, and she and Bronstein methodically boxed in the U-boat, forcing her to surface. The crew abandoned and scuttled their boat.

Bronstein and Breeman were detached on 22 March for special duty in Dakar, where they arrived on the 25th. There, they cleared space for 15 tons of gold ingots belonging to the Bank of Poland and worth over 60 million dollars. Once loaded, the two escorts sailed for New York with orders not to deviate from their course for any reason. They arrived on 3 April and were relieved of their precious cargo by an army of policemen and armored trucks.

Following a 10-day availability at the New York Navy Yard, Bronstein joined the screen of a Mediterranean-bound convoy and crossed the Atlantic without incident. The convoy reached Bizerte, Tunisia, on 4 May. Bronstein also escorted the returning convoy, which sailed on 11 May. A German submarine attacked and disabled two merchantmen on 14 May, and Bronstein remained at the scene until relieved by ships of Destroyer Division (DesDiv) 19. The remainder of the cruise passed more peacefully, and the convoy entered New York harbor on 29 May.

Bronstein sailed for Casco Bay, Maine, on 10 June for refresher training and then proceeded to Norfolk to join a hunter-killer group formed around Card (CVE-11). Designated task group TG 21.10, the group headed for Newfoundland in pursuit of a U-boat reported to be operating in that vicinity. Baker (DE-190) and Thomas sank U-233 on 5 July, and TG 21.10 set course for Boston to land the prisoners and for Thomas to repair damage she suffered while ramming the submarine. The task group left Boston, Massachusetts, on 10 July to patrol the West Indies. On the 16th, a plane spotted a contact 60 miles to the northwest of the formation, and Bostwick joined Bronstein in the search. In the early evening, Card suffered an engine casualty and, for six hours thereafter, lay dead in the water, making it impossible for the carrier to recover the airplane. Bronstein vectored the plane safely to Puerto Rico before spending the rest of the night in a fruitless search for the U-boat. The escorts rejoined TG 21.10 en route to San Juan, Puerto Rico, where they arrived on 18 July.

Three of the escorts resumed the search immediately after refueling. Baker and Bronstein relieved two of them on 24 July. The entire hunter-killer group continued to a point northeast of the Azores by 17 August without contacting any submarines; and, by the end of the month, the escorts were in the New York Navy Yard for repairs.

Following the yard work, Bronstein underwent refresher training in Casco Bay and then sailed for Norfolk to rejoin Card. On 18 September, she got underway with TG 22.2 for Bermuda to conduct coordinated air/sea/subsurface training exercises. The hunter-killer group then conducted an unsuccessful search north of the Azores for a reported submarine; and, after making a refueling stop at Casablanca on 25 and 26 October, TG 22.2 returned to New York.

Bronstein stood out to sea with TG 22.2 on 13 November for training near Bermuda. She spent Christmas in the West Indies, but returned to New York in time to celebrate New Year's Day, 1945. During January and the first two weeks of February, the destroyer escort performed a variety of duties such as lifeguard work for carrier qualifications, training, and coastal escort assignments. On 11 February, Bronstein departed Casco Bay to join Core (CVE-13) south of Iceland.

She sighted the Core group, TG 22.4, on 16 February; and all 12 destroyer escorts of the group formed a scouting line 90 miles long to search for a weather-reporting submarine believed to be in the vicinity. The task group did not find the U-boat, but did encounter high winds and mountainous seas. For two days, the escorts fought the weather and, as it improved, made needed repairs. The winds returned in force on the 23rd, but Bronstein made port safely at Hvalfjörður, Iceland, on 25 February.

On the last day of February, the destroyer escorts put to sea again to follow several submarines reportedly heading west toward the Flemish Cap. Although the weather had improved somewhat, the warships were continually pounded by the seas and were grateful to be relieved on 14 March. Bronstein arrived in New York on 17 March for five days of voyage repairs and then, with Baker, reported to New London, Connecticut, to serve as an escort and target ship for submarine training.

Bronstein returned to patrol duty on 14 April when all ships of her division received orders to search for a submarine off the entrance to Chesapeake Bay. With Baker and Breeman, Bronstein searched the southern channels. The group searching the northern channel attacked and sank a submarine on the night of 29 and 30 April. The warships sailed to New York and were there on 7 May to celebrate Germany's surrender.

On 9 May, Bronstein returned to screening carriers during pilot qualification flights, working with Card, Mission Bay (CVE-59), and Croatan (CVE-25). She interrupted this duty once, in July, to embark civilians for an "industrial incentive cruise" followed by a technical availability in the Brooklyn Navy Yard. Bronstein entered the Boston Navy Yard later in the year for repairs to one of her main engines and then sailed to New York on 23 October to participate in the Navy Day Review.

=== National Navy of Uruguay (1952-1988) ===
Bronstein departed New York on 3 November and proceeded to Green Cove Springs, Florida, where she was decommissioned on 17 June 1946 and berthed with the St. Johns River Group. On 3 May 1952, Bronstein was sold to Uruguay and recommissioned as ROU Artigas (DE-2). Her name was struck from the U.S. Navy List on 14 May 1952. Artigas (DE-2) was finally decommissioned and scrapped in 1988.

== Awards ==
Bronstein earned three battle stars for her World War II service.
