= USS Bostwick =

Cannon-class destroyer escort

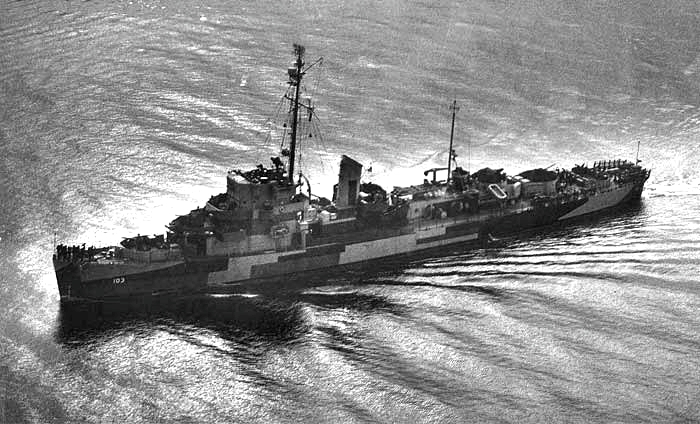

History

United States
- Name: USS Bostwick (DE-103)
- Namesake: Lucius Allyn Bostwick
- Builder: Dravo Corporation, Wilmington, Delaware
- Laid down: 6 February 1943
- Launched: 30 August 1943
- Commissioned: 1 December 1943
- Decommissioned: 30 April 1946
- Stricken: 10 February 1949
- Fate: Transferred to China, 14 December 1948

History

Taiwan
- Name: ROCN Taicang (太倉) (DE-25)
- Acquired: 14 December 1948
- Out of service: 1972
- Fate: Stricken and scrapped, 1973

General characteristics
- Class & type: Cannon-class destroyer escort
- Displacement: 1,240 tons
- Length: 306 ft (93 m)
- Beam: 36 ft 8 in (11.2 m)
- Draft: 8 ft 9 in (2.7 m)
- Propulsion: 4 GM Mod. 16-278A diesel engines with electric drive; 6,000 shp (4.5 MW); 2 screws
- Speed: 21 knots (39 km/h)
- Range: 10,800 nm at 12 kn
- Complement: 15 officers, 201 enlisted
- Armament: 3 × 3 in (76 mm)/50 guns (3×1); 2 × 40 mm Bofors AA guns (1x2); 8 × 20 mm Oerlikon AA guns (8×1); 3 × Torpedo tubes for 21-inch Mark 15 torpedo (1×3); 8 × depth charge projectors; 1 × Hedgehog anti-submarine mortar; 2 x depth charge tracks

USS Bostwick (DE-103) was a Cannon class destroyer escort in service with the United States Navy from 1943 to 1946. In 1948, she was sold to Taiwan where she served as Taicang (DE-25). She was scrapped in 1973.

== History ==
Bostwick was laid down on 6 February 1943 at Wilmington, Delaware, by the Dravo Corp.; launched on 30 August 1943; sponsored by Mrs. Fred D. Pierce; and commissioned on 1 December 1943.

=== U.S. Navy (1943–1948) ===
Following shakedown training near Bermuda in late December 1943- early January 1944, the new destroyer escort joined the Atlantic Fleet to serve as school ship for training prospective crews of destroyer escorts still under construction.

On 15 February, Bostwick joined Thomas, Bronstein, Breeman, and Corry in an antisubmarine patrol that took the warships involved all the way across the Atlantic to Casablanca, Morocco. Built around Block Island and designated Task Group 21.16 (TG 21.16), the ships operated as a hunter-killer group in the U-boat-infested waters of the North Atlantic.

Late on 29 February, Bronstein made radar contact with an unknown vessel. Bostwick and Thomas joined her in "boxing" the target, which was revealed by flares to be a surfaced German submarine, U-709. Bronstein opened fire with her guns, but the submarine managed to submerge. The three destroyer escorts tracked the U-boat, raining down a barrage of depth charges on her estimated positions. At 0324, Thomas dropped a pattern of charges that produced a huge underwater explosion, the last sounds heard from U-709.

TG 21.16 pulled into Casablanca on 8 March for rest and refueling, but got underway again only three days later to resume the patrol. Bostwick returned to the United States on 31 March to prepare for a transatlantic voyage as convoy escort. The convoy made the cruise without incident, arriving at Bizerte, Tunisia, on 4 May. Bostwick set out with a return convoy on 11 May and arrived safely in New York on the 30th.

The destroyer escort spent the next few weeks at Casco Bay, Maine in refresher training. On 25 June, she joined Card on another hunter-killer patrol in the Atlantic and in the West Indies. The group's first mission was to investigate a U-boat reported to be just south of Newfoundland. Thomas rammed U-233 on 5 July, sinking the submarine, and TG 22.10 returned to Boston, Massachusetts to land prisoners and make repairs. The hunter-killer group departed Boston again on the 10th, bound for the West Indies to search for a U-boat that had torpedoed several ships in the area. On 16 July, after a plane made a contact sixty miles from the group, Bostwick joined Bronstein in a night-long search for the supposed submarine. The effort proved futile, however, and the two destroyer escorts rejoined TG 22.10 at San Juan on 18 July. Bostwick returned to New York on 25 August for a 10-day availability.

In September, the warship sailed to Casco Bay for refresher training and then rejoined Card in TG 22.2 for three days of air and subsurface training near Bermuda. The warships returned to the hunt on the 25th. While north of the Azores en route to Casablanca, Bostwick mounted an attack against a submarine, but observed no signs of a definite kill. TG 22.2 spent 25–26 October in port Casablanca, then returned to New York, arriving there on 5 November.

Following a much needed availability in the New York Navy Yard, Bostwick returned to sea with Card for patrol duty in waters off Bermuda. TG 22.2 spent more than a month training in anticipation of an aggressive German submarine offensive. The group returned to New York on New Year's Eve.

Early in January 1945, Bostwick steamed to Narragansett Bay to screen Prince William while she conducted pilot qualifications. The destroyer escort returned to New York on 22 January and received orders to join Core in TG 22.4 for more hunter-killer activities. Bostwick met the task group at sea 600 miles south of Iceland on 16 February. The group, which consisted of 12 destroyer escorts and one escort carrier, formed a scouting line 90 miles long. Searching in vain for an enemy weather-reporting submarine, TG 22.4 soon found itself in winds of hurricane force. The mountainous seas died down as the wind lessened on the 22nd, but the escorts faced rising seas again before they reached port for refueling. Bostwick put into Hvalfjordür, Iceland, late on 25 February. TG 22.4 got underway again just three days later to track several German submarines reportedly heading west toward the Flemish Cap. While the weather had improved, but the seas remained heavy and continued to batter TG 22.4. Bostwick and her colleagues gratefully turned their duties overto TG 22.13 on 14 March.

The destroyer escort arrived in New York on 17 March for a five days of voyage repairs, after which she returned to planeguard duty for Card. On 14 April, Bostwick's escort division received orders to search for a submarine just outside the mouth of the Chesapeake Bay. The division split into northern and southern groups to scout the sea lanes. On 29 April, the northern group made contact with a submarine when Natchez sighted the snorkel of a U-boat. Bostwick, Thomas, and Coffman joined Natchez in dropping depth charges until heavy debris, a large oil slick, and a huge underwater explosion indicated the destruction of U-879.

Bostwick celebrated V-E Day in New York and then steamed to New London, England and later to Quonset Point, Rhode Island for training and to planeguard for pilot qualifications. In mid-July, the destroyer escort returned to New York to participate in the three-day demonstration cruise for civilian observers in the Navy's Industrial Incentive Program. Bostwick returned to planeguard duty for Mission Bay and Croatan, but a scheduled availability in the New York Navy Yard from 24 September – 15 October ended this duty. Late in October, Bostwick was on hand in New York for Navy Day activities.

Not long thereafter, the warship received orders for inactivation, and on 15 November headed for Green Cove Springs, Florida. Bostwick was decommissioned on 30 April 1946 and berthed in the St. Johns River with the Green Cove Springs Group, Atlantic Reserve Fleet.

=== Republic of China Navy (1948–1973) ===
She was sold to nationalist China on 14 December 1948 and renamed Taicang (太倉) (DE-25). Her name was struck from the US Navy list on 10 February 1949. When China was taken over by the Communists at the end of the Chinese Civil War, she escaped to Taiwan with Nationalist forces in 1949. On 13 February 1951, she led the task force under the direct order of ROC President Chiang Kai-shek to capture the Norwegian civilian freighter Hoi Houw at 24°13'N 123°18'E within the Japanese territory of Yaeyama Islands in the West Pacific Ocean. On 4 October 1953, she joined the task force executing the blockade policy to capture the Polish civilian oil tanker Praca at 21°06'N 122°48'E in the Philippine Sea. On 12 May 1954, she joined the fleet to bombard and capture another Polish civilian freighter Prezydent Gottwald with general cargo at 23°45′00″N 128°35′00″E, east of Batanes Islands and south of Okinawa Island. All ships were confiscated into the Republic of China Navy list, and the crews were either released, executed or detained for various time frames up to 35 years in captivity till 1988. She was scrapped in 1973.

== Awards ==
Bostwick earned two battle stars for her World War II service, and the following awards:

American Campaign Medal	European-African-Middle Eastern Campaign Medal w/ 2 service stars	World War II Victory Medal
