= USS Coffman =

Cannon-class destroyer escort

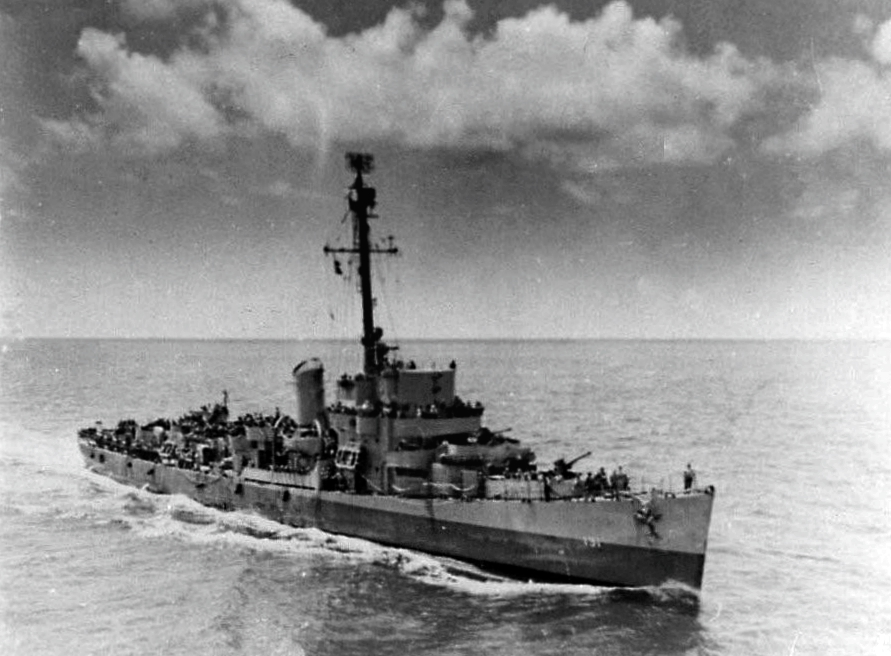

History

United States
- Name: USS Coffman
- Namesake: DeWitt Coffman
- Builder: Federal Shipbuilding and Drydock Company, Newark, New Jersey
- Laid down: 9 September 1943
- Launched: 28 November 1943
- Commissioned: 27 December 1943
- Decommissioned: 30 April 1946
- Stricken: 1 July 1972
- Honors and awards: 1 battle star (World War II)
- Fate: Sold for scrap, 17 August 1973

General characteristics
- Class & type: Cannon-class destroyer escort
- Displacement: 1,240 long tons (1,260 t) standard; 1,620 long tons (1,646 t) full
- Length: 306 ft (93 m) o/a; 300 ft (91 m) w/l
- Beam: 36 ft 10 in (11.23 m)
- Draft: 11 ft 8 in (3.56 m)
- Propulsion: 4 × GM Mod. 16-278A diesel engines with electric drive, 6,000 shp (4,474 kW), 2 screws
- Speed: 21 knots (39 km/h; 24 mph)
- Range: 10,800 nmi (20,000 km) at 12 kn (22 km/h; 14 mph)
- Complement: 15 officers and 201 enlisted
- Armament: 3 × single Mk.22 3-inch/50-caliber guns; 1 × twin 40 mm Mk.1 AA gun; 8 × 20 mm Mk.4 AA guns; 3 × 21 inch (533 mm) torpedo tubes; 1 × Hedgehog Mk.10 anti-submarine mortar (144 rounds); 8 × Mk.6 depth charge projectors; 2 × Mk.9 depth charge tracks

USS Coffman (DE-191) was a Cannon-class destroyer escort in service with the United States Navy from 1943 to 1946. She was sold for scrap in 1973.

== History ==
USS Coffman was named in honor of DeWitt Coffman, veteran of the Spanish–American War who was awarded the Navy Distinguished Service Medal during World War I. The ship was launched on 28 November 1943 by Federal Shipbuilding and Dry Dock Co., Newark, New Jersey; sponsored by Miss F. Liggett; and commissioned on 27 December 1943.

After one convoy escort voyage to Bizerte, Tunisia between 12 April and 3 May 1944, Coffman served between 10 June and 10 July as a target for submarines in training. Assigned to the hunter-killer group formed around the escort carrier Card (CVE-11), Coffman joined in training patrols and a voyage to Casablanca during which the group covered the movement of several convoys. Alternate periods of exercises and patrols continued until early in February 1945, when Coffman was ordered to join a group searching in stormy waters for a German weather ship reported south of Iceland.

She returned to screen carriers during air training operations out of Quonset Point, Rhode Island, until April, when the German U-boats made their last great effort of the war, penetrating the eastern Atlantic in strength. Coffman and her division were ordered to a search along the coast of Virginia, and on 30 April, she, with Thomas (DE-102), Bostwick (DE-103) and Natchez (PF-2), sank U-879 in 36°34′N 74°00′W.

After continued service to carriers and submarines in training, Coffman reported to Green Cove Springs, Florida, on 15 November 1945, and was decommissioned there on 30 April 1946 preparatory to disposal. Following the outbreak of the Korean War, she was removed from the sale list and placed in reserve. She was sold on 17 August 1973 and scrapped.

== Awards ==
Coffman received one battle star for World War II service.
