= USS Natchez (PF-2) =

River-class frigate of the U.S. Navy

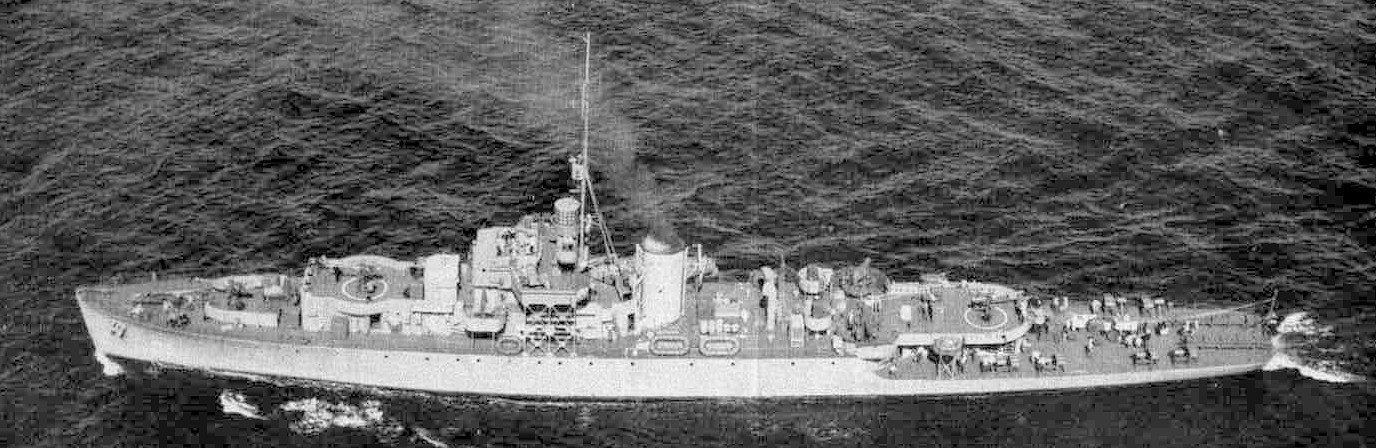
- Natchez on 13 October 1943

History

United States
- Name: USS Natchez
- Namesake: Natchez, Mississippi
- Builder: Canadian Vickers Ltd., Montreal
- Laid down: 16 March 1942 as HMS Annan
- Launched: 12 September 1942
- Acquired: 20 July 1942
- Commissioned: 16 December 1942
- Identification: PG-102 (1942); PF-2 (15 April 1943)
- Decommissioned: 11 October 1945
- Fate: Sold into civilian service, 29 July 1947; subsequently sold to Dominican Navy, 19 March 1948

Dominican Republic
- Name: Juan Pablo Duarte
- Namesake: Juan Pablo Duarte
- Acquired: 19 March 1948
- Identification: F102
- Fate: ran aground, 1949; sold for use as personal yacht, c. 1957; scrapped, 1959

General characteristics
- Class & type: River-class frigate
- Displacement: 2,360 tons
- Length: 301 ft 6 in (91.90 m)
- Beam: 36 ft 6 in (11.13 m)
- Draft: 13 ft 8 in (4.17 m)
- Propulsion: two 225 psi 3-drum express boilers, two 5,500 shp (4,100 kW) Canadian Vickers vertical triple expansion steam engines, two shaft.
- Speed: 20.3 knots (37.6 km/h; 23.4 mph)
- Complement: 194
- Armament: 3 x 3 in (76 mm)/50 cal. dual purpose gun mounts; 2 x Twin 40 mm gun mounts; 9 x 20 mm gun mounts; 2 x Depth charge racks; 8 x Depth charge projectors; 1 x Hedgehog depth charge projector

USS Natchez (PG-102/PF-2) was a River-class frigate (known as an Asheville-class patrol frigate in U.S. service) acquired by the U.S. Navy during World War II. She was originally ordered and laid down as HMS Annan for the Royal Navy, and renamed as HMCS Annan for the Royal Canadian Navy before transfer to the U.S. Navy before launch. She was used for anti-submarine patrol work during the war.

Post-war, she was decommissioned and ended up in the hands of the Dominican Navy as Juan Pablo Duarte in 1947, but ran aground and taken out of service in 1949. In 1950 she was sold to Puerto Rican engineer Félix Benítez as a private yacht. The ship was broken up in 1959.

== Career ==
Natchez was laid down on 16 March 1942 by Canadian Vickers Ltd., Montreal, Quebec, Canada as HMS Annan, later designated as HMCS Annan. Due to a lack of American patrol vessels she was transferred to the U.S. Navy on 20 July 1942. Launched on 12 September 1942, she was named USS Natchez (PG-102) on 8 October 1942 and commissioned at Ottawa, Ontario on 16 December 1942.

Natchez sailed under escort to Boston, Massachusetts, arriving at the Boston Navy Yard 16 January 1943 for fitting out. On 1 March she reported for duty to Commander Eastern Sea Frontier and was assigned escort duty for merchant convoys between Cuba and New York City. Natchez was redesignated as PF-2 on 15 April 1943.

On 4 December, Cuban freighter SS Libertad was reported missing from her convoy off the southern Atlantic coast. Natchez with several other patrol vessels, was dispatched to the scene, guided by homing signals from Navy blimps. Natchez found only three survivors who reported that their ship had been torpedoed and had sunk before they could notify the convoy commander.

Through 1944 Natchez escorted convoys and performed anti-submarine patrol duties. While on convoy duty 29 April 1945, she simultaneously received a sonar contact and sighted the snorkel of German submarine U-879, 98 mi (158 km) east of Cape Henry, Virginia. Launching an immediate attack, she was quickly joined by three destroyer escorts: Coffman, Bostwick and Thomas. Hedgehogs and depth charges were used as the four vessels sought to trap the enemy submarine. Finally contact was lost and a large quantity of oil was seen to rise to the surface, indicating destruction of the U-boat.

At the end of the war Natchez was still patrolling in the Atlantic. She returned to Charleston, South Carolina on 29 June 1945 for inactivation and disposal.

She was delivered to the Maritime Commission, 19 November 1945 for disposal. She was sold, 29 July 1947 to Louis Moore of Miami, Florida then resold on 19 March 1948 to the Dominican Republic as Juan Pablo Duarte (F102). She ran aground at Puerto Plata, Dominican Republic in November 1949 and taken out of service due to damage. She was then sold to Félix Benítez, a Puerto Rican engineer, who repaired her and converted her to his personal yacht Moineau. She was broken up in 1959.
