= George Breeman =

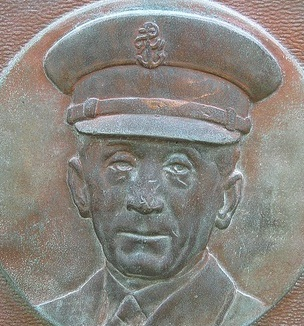
- Born: September 15, 1880; Passaic, New Jersey, US
- Died: April 10, 1937 (aged 56); Passaic, New Jersey, US
- Burial place: Arlington National Cemetery
- Military career
- Allegiance: United States
- Branch: United States Navy
- Service years: 1902 - 1906, 1912 - 1929
- Rank: Chief Turret Captain
- Unit: USS Kearsarge (BB-5)
- Awards: Medal of Honor

George Breeman (September 15, 1880 – April 10, 1937) was a United States Navy sailor who received the Medal of Honor for his heroism following a turret explosion in 1906 on board the battleship USS Kearsarge (BB-5).

== Biography ==
Born in Passaic, New Jersey, Breeman enlisted in the United States Navy on June 2, 1902, and was rated as a landsman for training. He served briefly in the receiving ships USS Columbia (C-12) and USS Franklin (1864) before being assigned to the gunboat USS Topeka (PG-35) on September 19, 1902. On March 23, 1903, while still in Topeka, he was rated an ordinary seaman. In May 1903, Breeman was reassigned to USS Kearsarge (BB-5).

On April 13, 1906, a flash fire occurred in Kearsarge's forward 13-inch turret, where Breeman was serving, killing several officers and men. Burning powder fell into the 13-inch handling room below. Breeman rushed from his battle station in the adjacent powder magazine into the handling room and stamped out the fires. He then returned to the magazine, closed the hatch to the handling room, and began replacing the covers on open powder tanks.

Breeman received the Medal of Honor on May 5, 1906, for his actions on board Kearsarge the previous month and received $100 as a gratuity.

Not long thereafter, his term of enlistment expired, and Breeman received an honorable discharge from the Navy. On September 16, 1912, he reenlisted at New York City. After a brief period of service in USS Nashville (PG-7), he transferred to the battleship USS New Hampshire (BB-25) on December 23, 1912, where he served for a little more than eight years.

During most of that time, his ship operated in the Caribbean and Gulf of Mexico. During America's participation in World War I, however, he and his ship helped to train gunners in northern waters. At the end of the war, Breeman made four voyages to Europe and back in USS New Hampshire (BB-25) bringing veterans home. During his long tour of duty in New Hampshire, he advanced to the rank of chief turret captain.

On May 20, 1921, Breeman transferred to the receiving ship at Hampton Roads, Virginia, before moving on to a tour of duty at the Naval Air Station Anacostia, in Washington, D.C. In March 1922, Breeman returned to sea in the new battleship USS California (BB-44). That final sea duty assignment lasted for almost three years. On May 31, 1927, he went ashore for the last time. After successive tours at the Naval Training Station, Hampton Roads, and the Navy Recruiting Station, Newark, New Jersey, Breeman was transferred to the Fleet Reserve on January 3, 1929.

Chief Turret Captain Breeman died of a heart attack on April 10, 1937, in Passaic. On April 14, 1947, he was buried in Section 6 of Arlington National Cemetery in Arlington, Virginia.

== USS Breeman ==
The destroyer escort USS Breeman (DE-104) was launched on September 4, 1943, by the Dravo Corporation of Wilmington, Delaware. The launching ceremony was sponsored by his niece, Mrs. Marie Breeman Schellgell. The vessel was commissioned by the United States Navy on December 12, 1943, with Lt. Comdr. Edward N.W. Hunter commanding. The boat saw service throughout the Atlantic Ocean during World War II, before being decommissioned on April 26, 1946. The Breeman was later transferred to the Nationalist government of China on October 29, 1948.

== Medal of Honor citation ==
Rank and organization: Seaman, U.S. Navy. Born: September 15, 1880, Passaic, N.J. Accredited to: New Jersey. G.O. No.: 21, May 5, 1906.

Citation:

Breeman displayed heroism in the line of his profession while serving on board the U.S.S. Kearsarge at the time of the accidental ignition of powder charges in the forward 13-inch turret.

== Legacy ==
Memorial to George Breeman within Veteran's Memorial Park in Passaic, New Jersey

A memorial to Breeman's heroism stands in Veteran's Memorial Park in Passaic, New Jersey.

== See also ==
- List of Medal of Honor recipients
- List of Medal of Honor recipients in non-combat incidents
