= German submarine U-709 =

German World War II submarine

History

Nazi Germany
- Name: U-709
- Ordered: 15 August 1940
- Builder: H. C. Stülcken Sohn, Hamburg
- Yard number: 773
- Laid down: 5 May 1941
- Launched: 14 April 1942
- Commissioned: 12 August 1942
- Fate: Missing since 19 February 1944

General characteristics
- Class & type: Type VIIC submarine
- Displacement: 769 tonnes (757 long tons) surfaced; 871 t (857 long tons) submerged
- Length: 67.10 m (220 ft 2 in) o/a; 50.50 m (165 ft 8 in) pressure hull
- Beam: 6.20 m (20 ft 4 in) o/a; 4.70 m (15 ft 5 in) pressure hull
- Height: 9.60 m (31 ft 6 in)
- Draught: 4.74 m (15 ft 7 in)
- Installed power: 2,800–3,200 PS (2,100–2,400 kW; 2,800–3,200 bhp) (diesels); 750 PS (550 kW; 740 shp) (electric)
- Propulsion: 2 shafts; 2 × diesel engines; 2 × electric motors
- Speed: 17.7 knots (32.8 km/h; 20.4 mph) surfaced; 7.6 knots (14.1 km/h; 8.7 mph) submerged
- Range: 8,500 nautical miles (15,700 km; 9,800 mi) at 10 knots (19 km/h; 12 mph)
- Test depth: 230 m (750 ft); Crush depth: 250–295 m (820–968 ft)
- Complement: 44–60 officers & ratings
- Armament: 5 × 53.3 cm (21 in) torpedo tubes (four bow, one stern); 14 × torpedoes; 1 × 8.8 cm (3.46 in) deck gun (220 rounds); 2 × twin 2 cm (0.79 in) C/30 anti-aircraft guns

Service record
- Part of: 5th U-boat Flotilla; 12 August 1942 – 28 February 1943; 9th U-boat Flotilla; 1 March 1943 – 19 February 1944
- Identification codes: M 49 765
- Commanders: Oblt.z.S. Karl-Otto Weber; 12 August 1942 – 2 December 1943; Oblt.z.S. Rudolf Ites; 3 December 1943 – 19 February 1944
- Operations: 5 patrols: 1st patrol: 13 February – 18 March 1943; 2nd patrol: 15 April – 23 May 1943; 3rd patrol: 5 – 20 July 1943; 4th patrol: a. 2 – 3 October 1943; b. 6 October – 28 November 1943; 5th patrol: 25 January – 19 February 1944
- Victories: None

German submarine U-709 was a Type VIIC U-boat of Nazi Germany's Kriegsmarine during World War II.

Ordered 15 August 1940, she was laid down on 5 May 1941 and launched 14 April 1942. From 12 August 1942 until 2 December 1943, she was commanded by Oberleutnant zur See Karl-Otto Weber, then captained by Oberleutnant zur See Rudolf Ites from 3 December 1943 until 19 February 1944.

== Design ==
German Type VIIC submarines were preceded by the shorter Type VIIB submarines. U-709 had a displacement of 769 tonnes (757 long tons) when at the surface and 871 tonnes (857 long tons) while submerged. She had a total length of 67.10 m (220 ft 2 in), a pressure hull length of 50.50 m (165 ft 8 in), a beam of 6.20 m (20 ft 4 in), a height of 9.60 m (31 ft 6 in), and a draught of 4.74 m (15 ft 7 in). The submarine was powered by two Germaniawerft F46 four-stroke, six-cylinder supercharged diesel engines producing a total of 2,800 to 3,200 metric horsepower (2,060 to 2,350 kW; 2,760 to 3,160 shp) for use while surfaced, two Garbe, Lahmeyer & Co. RP 137/c double-acting electric motors producing a total of 750 metric horsepower (550 kW; 740 shp) for use while submerged. She had two shafts and two 1.23 m (4 ft) propellers. The boat was capable of operating at depths of up to 230 metres (750 ft).

The submarine had a maximum surface speed of 17.7 knots (32.8 km/h; 20.4 mph) and a maximum submerged speed of 7.6 knots (14.1 km/h; 8.7 mph). When submerged, the boat could operate for 80 nautical miles (150 km; 92 mi) at 4 knots (7.4 km/h; 4.6 mph); when surfaced, she could travel 8,500 nautical miles (15,700 km; 9,800 mi) at 10 knots (19 km/h; 12 mph). U-709 was fitted with five 53.3 cm (21 in) torpedo tubes (four fitted at the bow and one at the stern), fourteen torpedoes, one 8.8 cm (3.46 in) SK C/35 naval gun, 220 rounds, and two twin 2 cm (0.79 in) C/30 anti-aircraft guns. The boat had a complement of between forty-four and sixty.

== Service history ==
U-709 had five patrols, from 12 August 1942 until 19 February 1944, during which she sank no ships.

=== Wolfpacks ===
U-709 took part in 15 wolfpacks, namely:

- Westmark (6 – 11 March 1943)
- Amsel (22 April – 3 May 1943)
- Amsel 3 (3 – 6 May 1943)
- Rhein (7 – 10 May 1943)
- Elbe 1 (10 – 14 May 1943)
- Without name (11 – 29 July 1943)
- Siegfried (22 – 27 October 1943)
- Siegfried 3 (27 – 30 October 1943)
- Jahn (30 October – 2 November 1943)
- Tirpitz 4 (2 – 8 November 1943)
- Eisenhart 6 (9 – 13 November 1943)
- Schill 2 (17 – 22 November 1943)
- Igel 2 (3 – 17 February 1944)
- Hai 1 (17 – 22 February 1944)
- Preussen (22 February – 1 March 1944)

== Fate ==
She has been missing since 19 February 1944 in the North Atlantic, with no explanation for her loss with all hands.

== Previously recorded fate ==
She was sunk by depth charges from the US destroyer escorts USS Thomas, USS Bostwick, and USS Bronstein while on patrol north of the Azores; all 52 crew members aboard died. Niestlé disagreed with the official account, and concluded that there was no known explanation for her loss.

== Bibliography ==
- Busch, Rainer; Röll, Hans-Joachim (1999). German U-boat commanders of World War II : a biographical dictionary. Translated by Brooks, Geoffrey. London, Annapolis, Md: Greenhill Books, Naval Institute Press. ISBN 1-55750-186-6.
- Busch, Rainer; Röll, Hans-Joachim (1999). Der U-Boot-Krieg, 1939-1945: Deutsche U-Boot-Verluste von September 1939 bis Mai 1945 [German U-boat losses from September 1939 to May 1945] (in German). Vol. IV. Hamburg, Berlin, Bonn: Mittler. ISBN 3-8132-0514-2.
- Gröner, Eric; Jung, Dieter; Maass, Martin (1991). German Warships 1815-1945: U-boats and Mine Warfare Vessels. Vol. 2. Translated by Thomas, Keith; Magowan, Rachel. London: Conway Maritime Press. ISBN 0-85177-593-4.
- Niestlé, Axel (30 June 2014). German U-Boat Losses During World War II: Details of Destruction. Frontline Books. ISBN 978-1-4738-3829-1.
