= German submarine U-359 =

German World War II submarine

History

Nazi Germany
- Name: U-359
- Ordered: 6 August 1940
- Builder: Flensburger Schiffbau-Gesellschaft, Flensburg
- Yard number: 478
- Laid down: 9 June 1941
- Launched: 11 June 1942
- Commissioned: 5 October 1942
- Fate: Sunk on 26 July 1943

General characteristics
- Class & type: Type VIIC submarine
- Displacement: 769 tonnes (757 long tons) surfaced; 871 t (857 long tons) submerged
- Length: 67.10 m (220 ft 2 in) o/a; 50.50 m (165 ft 8 in) pressure hull
- Beam: 6.20 m (20 ft 4 in) o/a; 4.70 m (15 ft 5 in) pressure hull
- Height: 9.60 m (31 ft 6 in)
- Draught: 4.74 m (15 ft 7 in)
- Installed power: 2,800–3,200 PS (2,100–2,400 kW; 2,800–3,200 bhp) (diesels); 750 PS (550 kW; 740 shp) (electric)
- Propulsion: 2 shafts; 2 × diesel engines; 2 × electric motors
- Speed: 17.7 knots (32.8 km/h; 20.4 mph) surfaced; 7.6 knots (14.1 km/h; 8.7 mph) submerged
- Range: 8,500 nmi (15,700 km; 9,800 mi) at 10 knots (19 km/h; 12 mph) surfaced; 80 nmi (150 km; 92 mi) at 4 knots (7.4 km/h; 4.6 mph) submerged
- Test depth: 230 m (750 ft); Crush depth: 250–295 m (820–968 ft)
- Complement: 4 officers, 40–56 enlisted
- Armament: 5 × 53.3 cm (21 in) torpedo tubes (four bow, one stern); 14 × torpedoes or 26 TMA mines; 1 × 8.8 cm (3.46 in) deck gun (220 rounds); 2 × twin 2 cm (0.79 in) C/30 anti-aircraft guns

Service record
- Part of: 8th U-boat Flotilla; 5 October 1942 – 28 February 1943; 7th U-boat Flotilla; 1 March – 26 July 1943
- Identification codes: M 49 818
- Commanders: Oblt.z.S. Heinz Förster; 5 October 1942 – 26 July 1943
- Operations: 3 patrols: 1st patrol: 4 February – 18 March 1943; 2nd patrol: 19 April – 20 May 1943; 3rd patrol: 29 June – 26 July 1943
- Victories: None

German submarine U-359 was a Type VIIC U-boat of Nazi Germany's Kriegsmarine during World War II.

She carried out three patrols. She did not sink or damage any ships.

She was sunk by an American aircraft in the Caribbean Sea on 26 July 1943.

== Design ==
German Type VIIC submarines were preceded by the shorter Type VIIB submarines. U-359 had a displacement of 769 tonnes (757 long tons) when at the surface and 871 tonnes (857 long tons) while submerged. She had a total length of 67.10 m (220 ft 2 in), a pressure hull length of 50.50 m (165 ft 8 in), a beam of 6.20 m (20 ft 4 in), a height of 9.60 m (31 ft 6 in), and a draught of 4.74 m (15 ft 7 in). The submarine was powered by two Germaniawerft F46 four-stroke, six-cylinder supercharged diesel engines producing a total of 2,800 to 3,200 metric horsepower (2,060 to 2,350 kW; 2,760 to 3,160 shp) for use while surfaced, two AEG GU 460/8–27 double-acting electric motors producing a total of 750 metric horsepower (550 kW; 740 shp) for use while submerged. She had two shafts and two 1.23 m (4 ft) propellers. The boat was capable of operating at depths of up to 230 metres (750 ft).

The submarine had a maximum surface speed of 17.7 knots (32.8 km/h; 20.4 mph) and a maximum submerged speed of 7.6 knots (14.1 km/h; 8.7 mph). When submerged, the boat could operate for 80 nautical miles (150 km; 92 mi) at 4 knots (7.4 km/h; 4.6 mph); when surfaced, she could travel 8,500 nautical miles (15,700 km; 9,800 mi) at 10 knots (19 km/h; 12 mph). U-359 was fitted with five 53.3 cm (21 in) torpedo tubes (four fitted at the bow and one at the stern), fourteen torpedoes, one 8.8 cm (3.46 in) SK C/35 naval gun, 220 rounds, and two twin 2 cm (0.79 in) C/30 anti-aircraft guns. The boat had a complement of between forty-four and sixty.

== Service history ==
The submarine was laid down on 9 June 1941 at the Flensburger Schiffbau-Gesellschaft yard at Flensburg as yard number 478, launched on 11 June 1942 and commissioned on 5 October under the command of Oberleutnant zur See Heinz Förster.

She served with the 8th U-boat Flotilla from 5 October 1942 and the 7th flotilla from 1 March 1943.

=== First patrol ===
U-359's first patrol took her from Kiel on 4 February 1943, through the Iceland / Faroe Islands 'gap' and south of Greenland. She arrived at St. Nazaire in occupied France, on 18 March.

=== Second patrol ===
During her second foray she crossed the Bay of Biscay and then turned in a southwesterly direction. The boat accordingly headed south before sailing northwest across the Atlantic.

=== Third patrol and loss ===
U-359 left St. Nazaire for the last time on 29 June 1943. On 26 July, she was sunk by depth charges dropped from a US Navy PBM Mariner aircraft in the Caribbean off Santo Domingo, Haiti.

47 men died; there were no survivors.

=== Previously recorded fate ===
U-359 was originally noted as sunk on 28 July 1943 by a Mariner aircraft P-1 of USN Squadron VP-32. (Postwar assessment). This attack sank U-159.

=== Wolfpacks ===
U-359 took part in seven wolfpacks, namely:

- Neptun (18 – 28 February 1943)
- Wildfang (28 February – 5 March 1943)
- Westmark (6 – 11 March 1943)
- Amsel (26 April – 3 May 1943)
- Amsel 4 (3 – 6 May 1943)
- Rhein (7 – 10 May 1943)
- Elbe 2 (10 – 12 May 1943)

== Bibliography ==
- Busch, Rainer; Röll, Hans-Joachim (1999). German U-boat commanders of World War II : a biographical dictionary. Translated by Brooks, Geoffrey. London, Annapolis, Md: Greenhill Books, Naval Institute Press. ISBN 1-55750-186-6.
- Busch, Rainer; Röll, Hans-Joachim (1999). Der U-Boot-Krieg, 1939-1945: Deutsche U-Boot-Verluste von September 1939 bis Mai 1945 [German U-boat losses from September 1939 to May 1945] (in German). Vol. IV. Hamburg, Berlin, Bonn: Mittler. ISBN 3-8132-0514-2.
- Gröner, Erich; Jung, Dieter; Maass, Martin (1991). U-boats and Mine Warfare Vessels. German Warships 1815–1945. Vol. 2. Translated by Thomas, Keith; Magowan, Rachel. London: Conway Maritime Press. ISBN 0-85177-593-4.
- Kemp, Paul (1999). U-Boats Destroyed – German Submarine Losses in the World Wars. London: Arms & Armour. ISBN 1-85409-515-3.
