= USS Breeman =

Cannon-class destroyer escort

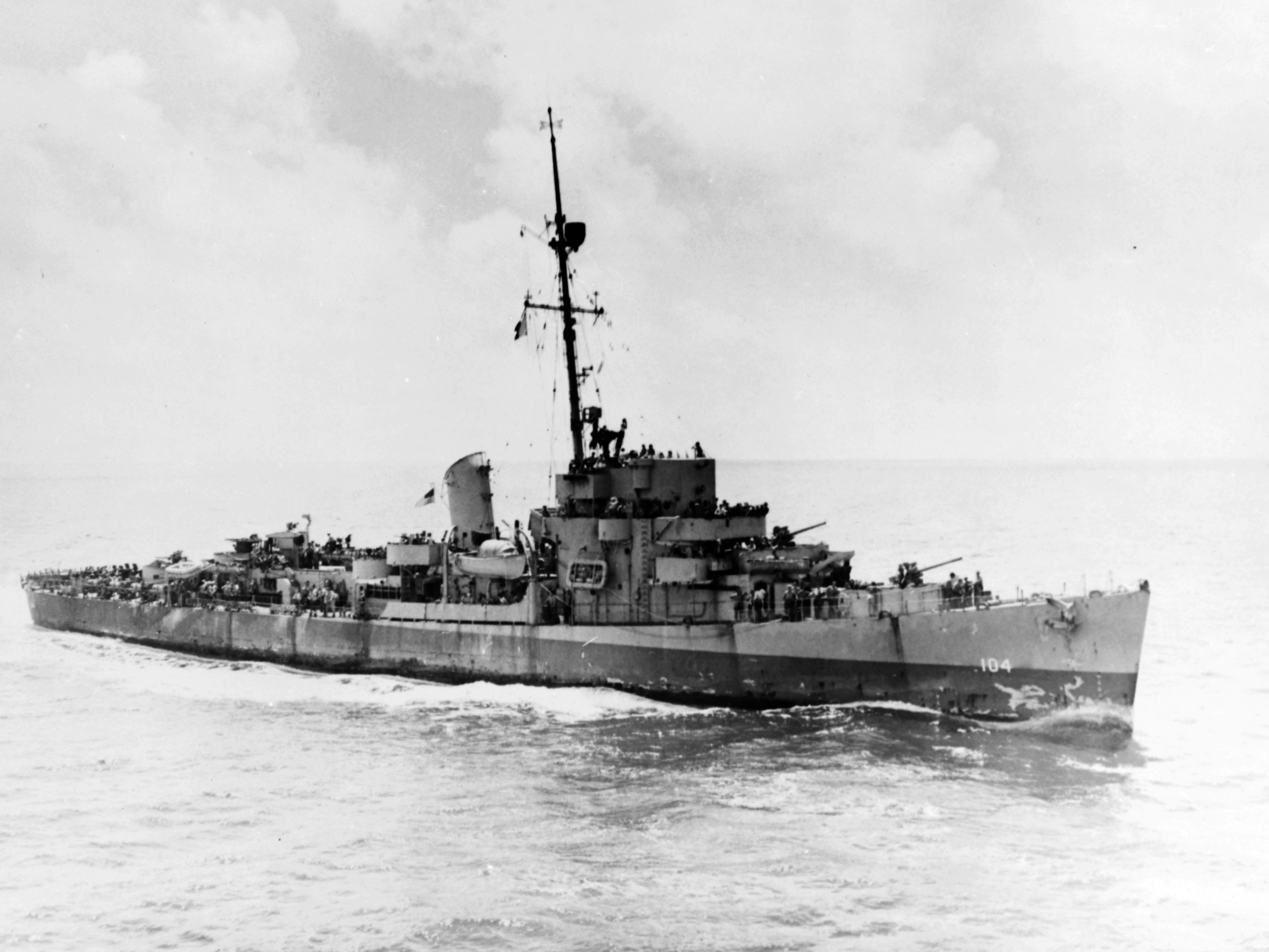

History

United States
- Name: USS Breeman (DE-104)
- Namesake: George Breeman
- Builder: Dravo Corporation, Wilmington, Delaware
- Laid down: 20 March 1943
- Launched: 4 September 1943
- Commissioned: 12 December 1943
- Decommissioned: 26 April 1946
- Stricken: 22 December 1948
- Fate: Transferred to China 29 October 1948

History

Taiwan
- Name: ROCS Taihu (太湖) (DE-24)
- Acquired: 29 October 1948
- Out of service: December 1972
- Fate: Stricken and scrapped, December 1972

General characteristics
- Class & type: Cannon-class destroyer escort
- Displacement: 1,240 tons
- Length: 306 ft (93 m)
- Beam: 36 ft 8 in (11.2 m)
- Draft: 8 ft 9 in (2.7 m)
- Propulsion: 4 GM Mod. 16-278A diesel engines with electric drive; 4.5 MW (6,000 shp), 2 screws
- Speed: 21 knots (39 km/h)
- Range: 10,800 nmi. at 12 knots
- Complement: 15 officers, 201 enlisted
- Armament: 3 × 3 in (76 mm)/50 guns (3×1); 2 × 40 mm Bofors AA guns (1x2); 8 × 20 mm Oerlikon AA guns (8×1); 3 × Torpedo tubes for 21-inch Mark 15 torpedo (1×3); 8 × depth charge projectors; 1 × Hedgehog anti-submarine mortar; 2 x depth charge tracks

USS Breeman (DE-104) was a Cannon class destroyer escort in service with the United States Navy from 1943 to 1946. In 1948, she was sold to Taiwan, where she served as Taihu (太湖) until 1972.

== History ==
=== United States Navy (1943–1948) ===
The ship was named for George Breeman, a Navy seaman who was awarded the Medal of Honor for extraordinary heroism during a turret explosion on USS Kearsarge (BB-5).

Breeman (DE-104) was laid down on 20 March 1943 at the Dravo Corporation shipyard in Wilmington, Delaware; launched on 4 September 1943, sponsored by Mrs. Marie Breeman Schellgell, niece of the late Chief Turret Captain Breeman; completed at the Norfolk Navy Yard; and commissioned there on 12 December 1943.

The destroyer escort spent the remainder of 1943 and the first week in 1944 outfitting at Norfolk. On 11 January 1944, she embarked upon her shakedown cruise to the waters around Bermuda. She completed the training period on 1 February and returned to Norfolk on 5 February for post-shakedown repairs. On 16 February, Breeman steamed out of Chesapeake Bay as an element of Escort Division (CortDiv) 48 which itself made up a part of the screen of Task Group (TG) 21.16, a hunter-killer group built around USS Block Island. After fueling off Fayal in the Azores, the task group headed north to provide antisubmarine support for transatlantic convoys. Though Breeman appears to have taken no direct part in the attacks, the task group accounted for at least two U-boats before entering Casablanca on 8 March. The destroyer escort put to sea with the Block Island task group again on 12 March. On the 19th, planes from Block Island sank German submarine U-1059, and Breeman assisted in the rescue of the U-boat's survivors.

Breeman and USS Bronstein parted company with TG 21.16 on 23 March. The following day, the two destroyer escorts put into Dakar, French West Africa, and began loading an unusual cargo – 60 million dollars in gold belonging to the Bank of Poland. The two warships departed Dakar on 26 March and proceeded to New York by the most direct and safest route and arrived there on 3 April. Following repairs, Breeman returned to sea on 12 April with another hunter-killer force which formed a portion of the screen for Convoy UGS-39. She and her convoy entered Bizerte, Tunisia, safely on 3 May. On the return voyage, the destroyer escort helped to screen Convoy GUS 39, arriving in Norfolk on 29 May. After an availability at the New York Navy Yard, she spent nine days during mid-June engaged in training at Casco Bay, Maine.

On 21 June, the destroyer escort headed south to the vicinity of Bermuda where she joined TG 22.10—another hunter-killer group built around Card (CVE-11). Once again, the task group attacked a number of sonar contacts and sank at least one U-boat. Breeman, however, shared none of the credit for the sinking. The warship returned to New York late in August and, after repairs, conducted training at Casco Bay in early September. On 18 September, she rejoined the Card task group near Bermuda for further training. Soon thereafter, Breeman suffered propeller damage that forced her to return to the New York Navy Yard. She completed repairs by 23 October, and put to sea that same day for torpedo training at the Submarine Base, New London, Connecticut, and in Casco Bay. On 24 November the destroyer escort and the rest of CortDiv 48 joined company with Card once again to form TG 22.2. For about a month, the warship trained in anti-submarine warfare (ASW) tactics in the waters surrounding Bermuda. She returned to New York on 29 December.

Breeman rejoined TG 22.2 on 12 January 1945 to act as plane guard and escort during carrier qualifications off Quonset Point, Rhode Island. On 22 January, the destroyer escort and her colleagues of CortDiv 48 joined Bogue (CVE-9) in shaping a course for Norfolk. In late February and early March, Breeman returned to sea with a hunter-killer group built around Bogue for a fruitless search for German weather submarines purportedly operating to the south of Iceland. She and the rest of her task group entered New York on 17 March. During the first part of April, the destroyer escort conducted training at New London as a unit of a hunter-killer group built around Card. Between 15 April and 5 May, that task group hunted for submarines off the Virginia capes. Later, in May, Breeman moved north to Quonset Point where she served as a plane guard during carrier qualifications.

In mid-August, the warship joined Mission Bay (CVE-59) in a voyage to Port Everglades, Florida. Once again plane guard operations occupied her time during the visit to the Florida coast.

On 2 October, however, she headed north once again. At the New York Navy Yard, Breeman began the inactivation process. That phase lasted until 13 November when she got underway for Florida again. On 16 November, the destroyer escort arrived in Green Cove Springs, Florida, to begin final preparations for decommissioning. Breeman was decommissioned on 26 April 1946 and berthed with the Green Cove Springs Group, Atlantic Reserve Fleet.

=== Republic of China Navy (1948–1972) ===
She remained there until 29 October 1948 at which time she was transferred to the Nationalist Chinese government based on Taiwan. She was commissioned in their Navy as Taihu (太湖) (DE-24). Her name was struck from the Navy list on 22 December 1948.

On 12 May 1954, She joined the fleet executing the blockade policy in bombardments to capture and confiscating the Polish civilian freighter Prezydent Gottwald with 7,066 tons of general cargo at 23°45′00″N 128°35′00″E, east of Batanes Islands and south of Okinawa Island in the west Pacific Ocean, whereas 33 Polish sailors and 12 Chinese sailors were first detained in Keelung then Zuoying with various time frames of releases, executions, death or imprisonment up to 34 years of captivity.

== Honors ==
Breeman earned one battle star for World War II service.
