= German submarine U-603 =

German World War II submarine

History

Nazi Germany
- Name: U-603
- Ordered: 22 May 1940
- Builder: Blohm & Voss, Hamburg
- Yard number: 579
- Laid down: 27 February 1941
- Launched: 16 November 1941
- Commissioned: 2 January 1942
- Fate: Missing since 19 February 1944

General characteristics
- Class & type: Type VIIC submarine
- Displacement: 769 tonnes (757 long tons) surfaced; 871 t (857 long tons) submerged
- Length: 67.10 m (220 ft 2 in) o/a; 50.50 m (165 ft 8 in) pressure hull
- Beam: 6.20 m (20 ft 4 in) o/a; 4.70 m (15 ft 5 in) pressure hull
- Height: 9.60 m (31 ft 6 in)
- Draught: 4.74 m (15 ft 7 in)
- Installed power: 2,800–3,200 PS (2,100–2,400 kW; 2,800–3,200 bhp) (diesels); 750 PS (550 kW; 740 shp) (electric)
- Propulsion: 2 shafts; 2 × diesel engines; 2 × electric motors
- Speed: 17.7 knots (32.8 km/h; 20.4 mph) surfaced; 7.6 knots (14.1 km/h; 8.7 mph) submerged
- Range: 8,500 nmi (15,700 km; 9,800 mi) at 10 knots (19 km/h; 12 mph) surfaced; 80 nmi (150 km; 92 mi) at 4 knots (7.4 km/h; 4.6 mph) submerged
- Test depth: 230 m (750 ft); Crush depth: 250–295 m (820–968 ft)
- Complement: 4 officers, 40–56 enlisted
- Armament: 5 × 53.3 cm (21 in) torpedo tubes (four bow, one stern); 14 × torpedoes or 26 TMA mines; 1 × 8.8 cm (3.46 in) deck gun (220 rounds); 1 x 2 cm (0.79 in) C/30 AA gun

Service record
- Part of: 5th U-boat Flotilla; 2 January – 30 November 1942; 1st U-boat Flotilla; 1 December 1942 – 19 February 1944
- Identification codes: M 47 142
- Commanders: Kptlt. Kurt Kölzer; 2 January – 12 September 1942; Oblt.z.S. Hans-Joachim Bertelsmann; 13 September 1942 – 2 May 1943; Oblt.z.S. Rudolf Baltz; 3 May 1943 – 28 January 1944; Kptlt. Hans-Joachim Bertelsmann; 29 January – 19 February 1944
- Operations: 5 patrols: 1st patrol: 23 November – 9 December 1942; 2nd patrol: 7 February – 26 March 1943; 3rd patrol: 5 May – 16 July 1943; 4th patrol: 9 September – 3 November 1943; 5th patrol: 5 – 19 February 1944
- Victories: 4 merchant ships sunk (22,406 GRT)

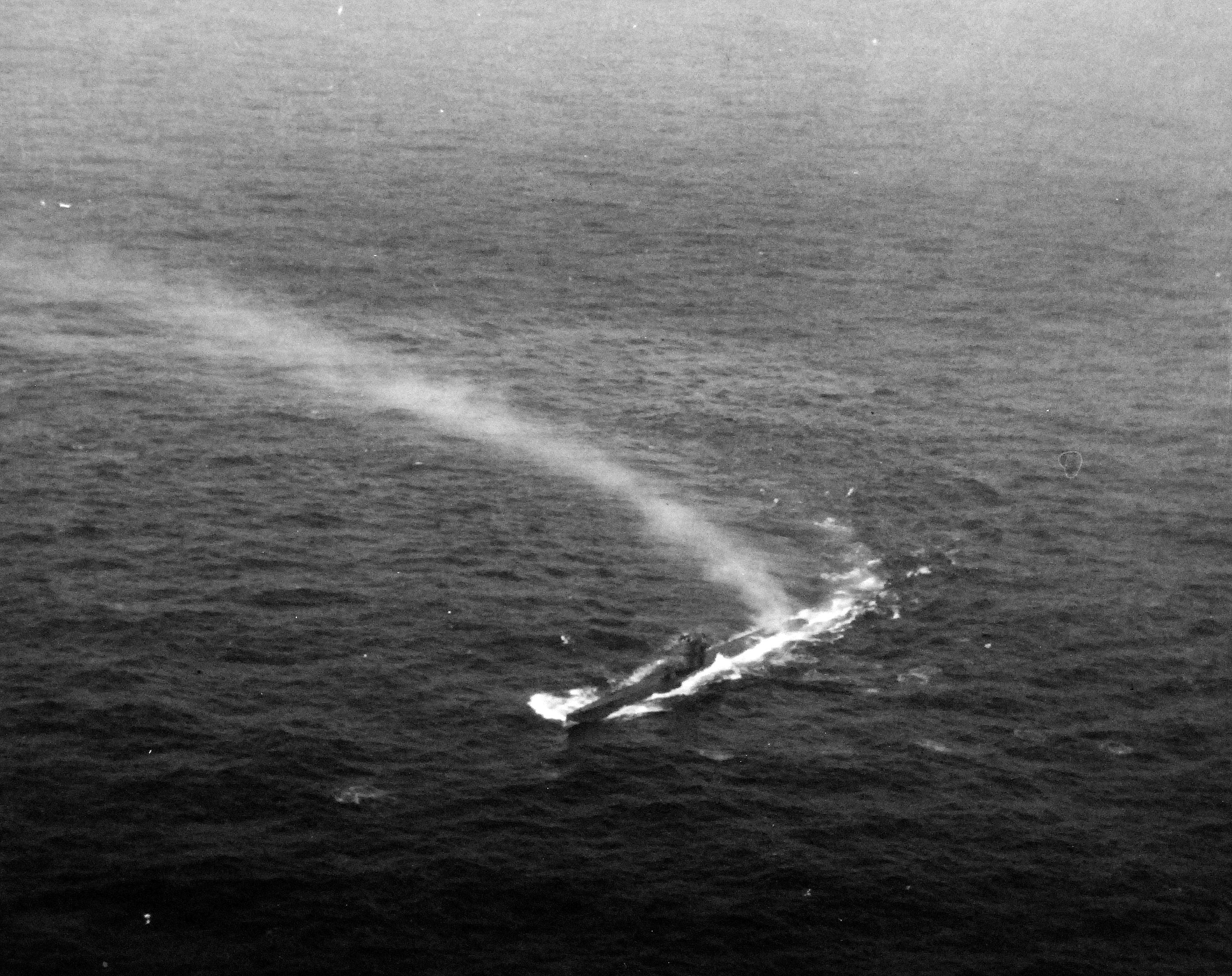
German submarine U-603

German submarine U-603 was a Type VIIC U-boat built for Nazi Germany's Kriegsmarine for service during World War II. She was laid down on 27 February 1941 by Blohm & Voss, Hamburg as yard number 579, launched on 16 November 1941 and commissioned on 2 January 1942 under Kapitänleutnant Kurt Kölzer.

== Design ==
German Type VIIC submarines were preceded by the shorter Type VIIB submarines. U-603 had a displacement of 769 tonnes (757 long tons) when at the surface and 871 tonnes (857 long tons) while submerged. She had a total length of 67.10 m (220 ft 2 in), a pressure hull length of 50.50 m (165 ft 8 in), a beam of 6.20 m (20 ft 4 in), a height of 9.60 m (31 ft 6 in), and a draught of 4.74 m (15 ft 7 in). The submarine was powered by two Germaniawerft F46 four-stroke, six-cylinder supercharged diesel engines producing a total of 2,800 to 3,200 metric horsepower (2,060 to 2,350 kW; 2,760 to 3,160 shp) for use while surfaced, two Brown, Boveri & Cie GG UB 720/8 double-acting electric motors producing a total of 750 metric horsepower (550 kW; 740 shp) for use while submerged. She had two shafts and two 1.23 m (4 ft) propellers. The boat was capable of operating at depths of up to 230 metres (750 ft).

The submarine had a maximum surface speed of 17.7 knots (32.8 km/h; 20.4 mph) and a maximum submerged speed of 7.6 knots (14.1 km/h; 8.7 mph). When submerged, the boat could operate for 80 nautical miles (150 km; 92 mi) at 4 knots (7.4 km/h; 4.6 mph); when surfaced, she could travel 8,500 nautical miles (15,700 km; 9,800 mi) at 10 knots (19 km/h; 12 mph). U-603 was fitted with five 53.3 cm (21 in) torpedo tubes (four fitted at the bow and one at the stern), fourteen torpedoes, one 8.8 cm (3.46 in) SK C/35 naval gun, 220 rounds, and a 2 cm (0.79 in) C/30 anti-aircraft gun. The boat had a complement of between forty-four and sixty.

== Service history ==
The boat's career began with training at 5th U-boat Flotilla on 2 January 1942, followed by active service on 1 December 1942 as part of the 1st Flotilla for the remainder of her service.

In five patrols she sank four merchant ships, for a total of 22,406 gross register tons (GRT).

On 4 December 1942 she was returning to base when she spotted a convoy and attacked by convoy escorts, but not before reporting to base and calling in support boats.

On 8 July 1943 she was attacked by a RAF Catalina with depth charges and slightly damaged.

On 13 October 1943 an Avenger from USS Card dropped a FIDO Homing Torpedo but she successfully evaded the attack.

=== Convoy ON 166 ===
On 21 February 1943, while operating against Convoy ON 166, she jointly attacked the Norwegian motor tanker Stigstad with U-332. U-332 hit her first with one torpedo, closely followed by two further torpedoes from U-603 which broke her back; sinking her in 15 minutes.

Two nights later she finished off the straggling Norwegian motor tanker Glittre with two torpedoes.

=== Convoy HX 237 ===
Now under the command of Oberleutnant zur See Rudolf Baltz, U-603 attacked convoy HX 237 and successfully sank the Norwegian motor vessel Brand on 12 May 1943.

=== Wolfpacks ===
U-603 took part in 13 wolfpacks, namely:

- Ritter (14 – 26 February 1943)
- Burggraf (4 – 5 March 1943)
- Raubgraf (7 – 20 March 1943)
- Oder (17 – 19 May 1943)
- Mosel (19 – 24 May 1943)
- Trutz (1 – 16 June 1943)
- Trutz 2 (16 – 29 June 1943)
- Geier 1 (30 June – 14 July 1943)
- Leuthen (15 – 24 September 1943)
- Rossbach (24 September – 9 October 1943)
- Igel 2 (15 – 17 February 1944)
- Hai 1 (17 – 22 February 1944)
- Preussen (22 February – 1 March 1944)

=== Fate ===
U-603 has been missing since 19 February 1944 in the North Atlantic.

=== Previously recorded fate ===
U-603 was sunk on 1 March 1944 in the North Atlantic in position 48°55′N 26°10′W, by depth charges from USS Bronstein. The attack was actually against a non-submarine target.

== Summary of raiding history ==
Date	Ship Name	Nationality	Tonnage (GRT)	Fate
21 February 1943	Stigstad	Norway	5,964	Sunk
23 February 1943	Glittre	Norway	6,409	Sunk
16 March 1943	Elin K	Norway	5,214	Sunk
12 May 1943	Brand	Norway	4,819	Sunk

== Bibliography ==
- Busch, Rainer; Röll, Hans-Joachim (1999). German U-boat commanders of World War II : a biographical dictionary. Translated by Brooks, Geoffrey. London, Annapolis, Md: Greenhill Books, Naval Institute Press. ISBN 1-55750-186-6.
- Busch, Rainer; Röll, Hans-Joachim (1999). Der U-Boot-Krieg, 1939-1945: Deutsche U-Boot-Verluste von September 1939 bis Mai 1945 [German U-boat losses from September 1939 to May 1945] (in German). Vol. IV. Hamburg, Berlin, Bonn: Mittler. ISBN 3-8132-0514-2.
- Edwards, Bernard (1996). Dönitz and the Wolf Packs - The U-boats at War. Cassell. pp. 129, 155, 156, 160, 208. ISBN 0-304-35203-9.
- Gröner, Eric; Jung, Dieter; Maass, Martin (1991). German Warships 1815-1945: U-boats and Mine Warfare Vessels. Vol. 2. Translated by Thomas, Keith; Magowan, Rachel. London: Conway Maritime Press. ISBN 0-85177-593-4.
- Sharpe, Peter (1998). U-Boat Fact File. Great Britain: Midland Publishing. ISBN 1-85780-072-9.
