= USS Prince William (CVE-31) =

U. S. Navy transport ship

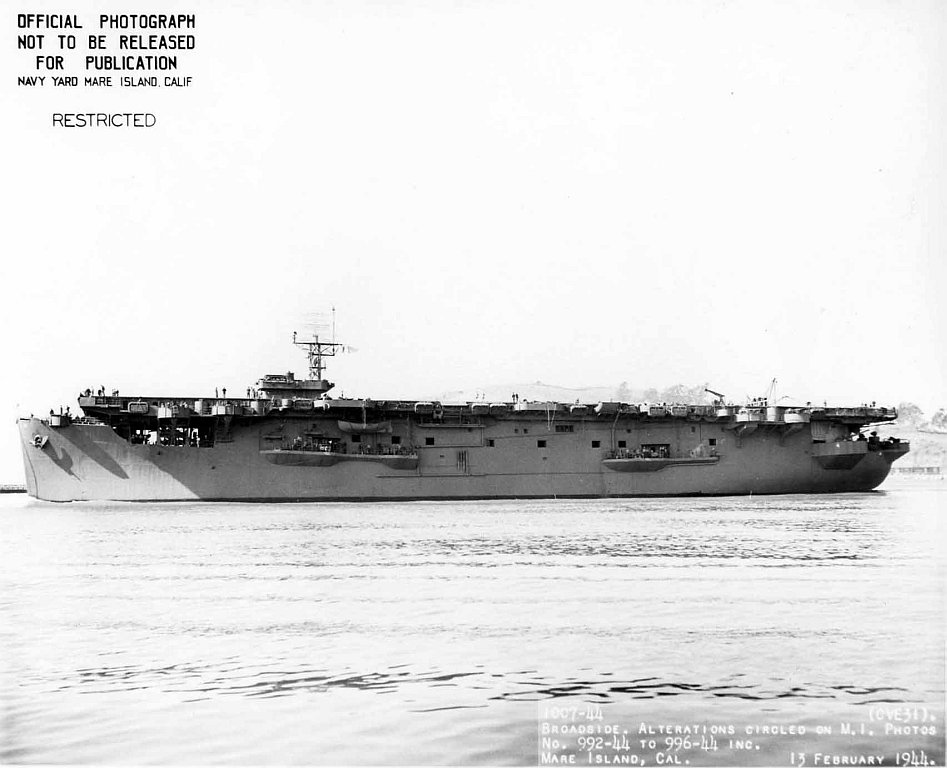

United States
- Name: Prince William
- Namesake: Prince William Sound, Alaska
- Ordered: as type (C3-S-A1 hull), MC hull 198
- Awarded: 30 September 1940
- Builder: Seattle-Tacoma Shipbuilding Corporation, Tacoma, Washington
- Cost: $7,992,456
- Yard number: 78
- Way number: 1
- Laid down: 15 December 1941 (this was the Prince William AVG-19 that was given to Britain, losing the name)
- Launched: 7 May 1942 (this was the Prince William AVG-19 that was given to Britain, becoming HMS Striker)
- Commissioned: 9 April 1943
- Decommissioned: 29 August 1946
- Reclassified: ACV, 20 August 1942; CVE, 15 July 1943; CVHE, 12 June 1955
- Stricken: 1 March 1959
- Identification: Hull symbol: AVG-31; ACV-31; CVE-31; CVHE-31; Code letters: NYJA
- Fate: Scrapped, 1961

General characteristics
- Class & type: Bogue-class escort carrier
- Displacement: 8,390 long tons (8,520 t) (standard); 13,980 long tons (14,200 t) (full load)
- Length: 465 ft (142 m) (wl); 495 ft 8 in (151.08 m) (oa); 440 ft (130 m) (fd)
- Beam: 69 ft 6 in (21.18 m) wl; 82 ft (25 m) (fd); 111 ft 6 in (33.99 m) (extreme width)
- Draft: 23 ft 3 in (7.09 m) (mean); 26 ft (7.9 m) (max)
- Installed power: 2 × Foster-Wheeler 285 psi (1,970 kPa) boilers; 8,500 shp (6,300 kW)
- Propulsion: 1 × Allis-Chalmers steam turbine; 1 × Screw
- Speed: 18 kn (33 km/h; 21 mph)
- Complement: 890 officers and enlisted
- Armament: As designed: 2 × 5 in (127 mm)/51 caliber; 10 × 20 mm (0.79 in) Oerlikon anti-aircraft cannons; Varied, ultimate armament: 2 × 5 in (127 mm)/38 cal dual-purpose gun (DP); 8 × twin 40 mm (1.57 in) Bofors anti-aircraft guns; 20 × 20 mm Oerlikon anti-aircraft cannons
- Aircraft carried: 19-24
- Aviation facilities: 1 × hydraulic catapult; 2 × elevators

USS Prince William (CVE-31) was ordered under a United States Maritime Commission contract as MC Hull 242. She was intended to be the 24th ship of the Ruler class, the second subset of the broad, 45-ship Bogue class--the eleven ships of the class that were retained by the U.S. Navy were, by themselves, also referred to as the Bogue class-+to be transferred to Britain under Lend-Lease, but instead became the only ship of that group to be retained by the U.S. Navy. Sponsored by Mrs. Paul Foley, Prince William was laid down on 18 May 1942 at the Seattle-Tacoma Shipbuilding Corporation's yard at Tacoma, Washington as Aircraft Transport, General (AVG) 31. She was redesignated as Auxiliary Aircraft Carrier (ACV) 31 on 20 August 1942; was launched on 23 August 1942; and was commissioned on 9 April 1943, with Captain Herbert E. Regan in command. She was finally redesignated as Escort Aircraft Carrier (CVE) 31 on 15 July 1943. The ship was named after Prince William Sound, Alaska.

== Service history ==
Following an abbreviated shakedown off the west coast, Prince William reported for duty with the Pacific Fleet’s air arm to ferry planes and transport personnel to forward areas. Redesignated CVE-31 on 15 July 1943, she operated between the west coast and such places as New Caledonia, Canton Island, Samoa and Espiritu Santo until the spring of 1944.

Then, a brief assignment at San Diego, training and qualifying pilots, preceded her return to ferrying duties in mid-April 1944. She completed a run to Townsville, Australia, 7 May 1944, and, on her return to San Diego, was reassigned to the Atlantic Fleet. Unloading aircraft and cargo at Port Everglades, Florida, 21 June 1944, she continued on to Norfolk where new navigational equipment (LORAN) was installed. During July and into August, she qualified pilots in the Chesapeake Bay area, then, on 24 August 1944, resumed plane and personnel ferry services with a run to Casablanca. Returning with worn airplane engines and parts, she moored at Norfolk 26 September 1944 for availability. Prince William returned to training duties in mid-October 1944.

Until 26 January 1945, she qualified pilots in the Narrangansett Bay area, then shifted to Key West. There she continued to carry out her mission as a training carrier until returning to Norfolk in May. On 2 June 1945, the CVE got underway for the Panama Canal and on the 8th rejoined the Pacific Fleet. Again assigned to ferrying duties, she transported planes and personnel between the west coast and Hawaii for the remainder of World War II.

After the cessation of hostilities, Prince William was assigned to “Magic Carpet” duty and for the next seven months returned military personnel and equipment to the United States. Completing her last run at San Diego, 21 March 1946, she was ordered to the Atlantic Reserve Fleet and on 8 April 1946 got underway for the Panama Canal. Arriving at Norfolk on 23 April 1946, she continued on, two days later, to Philadelphia where she decommissioned 29 August 1946.

Reclassified CVHE-31, 12 June 1955, Prince William remained a unit of the Philadelphia Group, Atlantic Reserve Fleet until struck from the Naval Register 1 March 1959. She was sold for scrap in Japan in March 1961.

== Bibliography ==
- Gerhardt, Frank A. "Prince William". United States Maritime Commission 1936 thru 1950.
- "Prince William". DANFS. Navy Department, Naval History and Heritage Command. 10 November 2015. This article incorporates text from this source, which is in the public domain.
- Yarnall, Paul (21 March 2023). "USS PRINCE WILLIAM (ACV-31)". NavSource.
