= USS Mission Bay =

Casablanca-class escort carrier of the US Navy

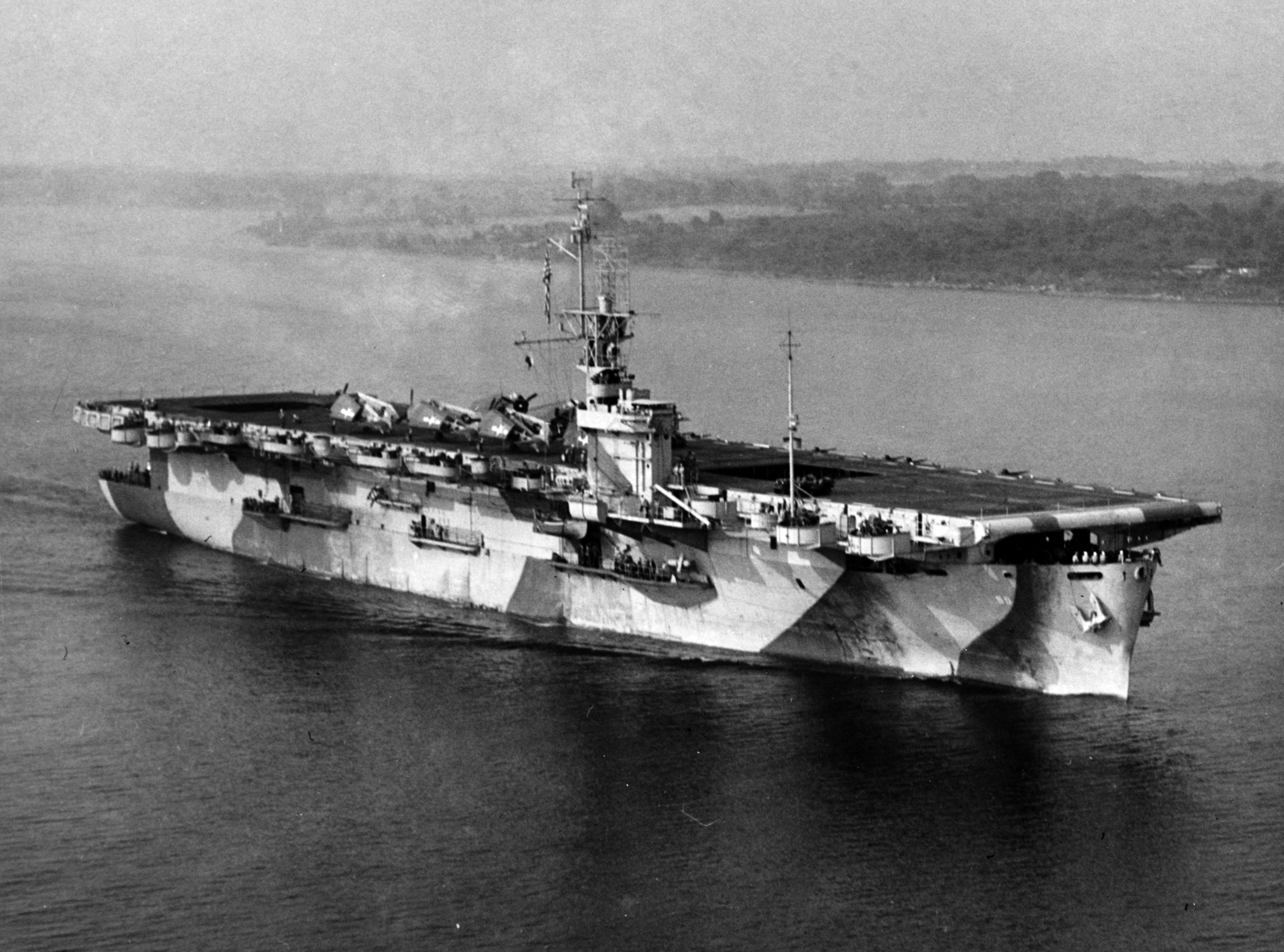
- USS Mission Bay underway, August 1944

History

United States
- Name: Mission Bay
- Namesake: Mission Bay, California
- Ordered: as a Type S4-S2-BB3 hull, MCE hull 1096
- Awarded: 18 June 1942
- Builder: Kaiser Shipyards
- Laid down: 28 December 1942
- Launched: 26 May 1943
- Commissioned: 13 September 1943
- Decommissioned: 21 February 1947
- Identification: Hull symbol: CVE-59
- Fate: Sold for scrap, 30 April 1959

General characteristics
- Class & type: Casablanca-class escort carrier
- Displacement: 8,188 long tons (8,319 t) (standard); 10,902 long tons (11,077 t) (full load)
- Length: 512 ft 3 in (156.13 m) (oa); 490 ft (150 m) (wl); 474 ft (144 m) (fd)
- Beam: 65 ft 2 in (19.86 m); 108 ft (33 m) (extreme width)
- Draft: 20 ft 9 in (6.32 m) (max)
- Installed power: 4 × Babcock & Wilcox boilers; 9,000 shp (6,700 kW)
- Propulsion: 2 × Skinner Unaflow reciprocating steam engines; 2 × screws
- Speed: 19 knots (35 km/h; 22 mph)
- Range: 10,240 nmi (18,960 km; 11,780 mi) at 15 kn (28 km/h; 17 mph)
- Complement: Total: 910 – 916 officers and men; Embarked Squadron: 50 – 56; Ship's Crew: 860
- Armament: As designed: 1 × 5 in (127 mm)/38 cal dual-purpose gun; 4 × twin 40 mm (1.57 in) Bofors anti-aircraft guns; 12 × 20 mm (0.79 in) Oerlikon anti-aircraft cannons; Varied, ultimate armament: 1 × 5 in (127 mm)/38 cal dual-purpose gun; 8 × twin 40 mm (1.57 in) Bofors anti-aircraft guns; 20 × 20 mm (0.79 in) Oerlikon anti-aircraft cannons
- Aircraft carried: 27
- Aviation facilities: 1 × catapult; 2 × elevators

Service record
- Part of: United States Eighth Fleet (1943–46); Atlantic Reserve Fleet (1946–58)
- Operations: Battle of the Atlantic

USS Mission Bay (CVE-59) was a Casablanca-class escort carrier of the United States Navy. She was named after Mission Bay, located northwest of San Diego. Launched in May 1943, and commissioned in September, she served as a transport carrier, ferrying aircraft to bases in Europe, Africa, and Asia. She also participated in the Battle of the Atlantic, protecting convoys and conducting antisubmarine patrols. Notably, she escorted President Roosevelt on-board the cruiser Quincy as he returned from the Yalta Conference. She was decommissioned in February 1947, when she was mothballed in the Atlantic Reserve Fleet. Ultimately, she was sold for scrapping in April 1959.

== Design and description ==
A side profile of the design of Thetis Bay.

Mission Bay was a Casablanca-class escort carrier, the most numerous type of aircraft carriers ever built. Built to stem heavy losses during the Battle of the Atlantic, they came into service in late 1943, by which time the U-boat threat was already in retreat. Although some did see service in the Atlantic, the majority were utilized in the Pacific, ferrying aircraft, providing logistics support, and conducting close air support for the island-hopping campaigns. The Casablanca-class carriers were built on the standardized Type S4-S2-BB3 hull, a lengthened variant of the Doyen-class hull, and specifically designed to be mass-produced using welded prefabricated sections. This allowed them to be produced at unprecedented speeds: the final ship of her class, Munda, was delivered to the Navy just 101 days after the laying of her keel.

Mission Bay was 512 ft 3 in (156.13 m) long overall (490 ft (150 m) at the waterline), had a beam of 65 ft 2 in (19.86 m), and a draft of 20 ft 9 in (6.32 m). She displaced 8,188 long tons (8,319 t) standard, which increased to 10,902 long tons (11,077 t) with a full load. To carry out flight operations, the ship had a 257 ft (78 m) hangar deck and a 474 ft (144 m) flight deck. Her compact size necessitated the installation of an aircraft catapult at her bow, and there were two aircraft elevators to facilitate movement of aircraft between the flight and hangar deck: one each fore and aft.

She was powered by four Babcock & Wilcox Express D boilers that raised 285 psi (1,970 kPa) of steam at 577 °F (303 °C). The steam generated by these boilers fed two Skinner Unaflow reciprocating steam engines, delivering 9,000 hp (6,700 kW) to two propeller shafts. This allowed her to reach speeds of 19 kn (35 km/h; 22 mph), with a cruising range of 10,240 nmi (18,960 km; 11,780 mi) at 15 kn (28 km/h; 17 mph). For armament, one 5 in (127 mm)/38 caliber dual-purpose gun was mounted on the stern. Additional anti-aircraft defense was provided by eight Bofors 40 mm (1.57 in) anti-aircraft guns in single mounts and twelve Oerlikon 20 mm (0.79 in) cannons mounted around the perimeter of the deck. By 1945, Casablanca-class carriers had been modified to carry twenty Oerlikon cannons and sixteen Bofors guns; the doubling of the latter was accomplished by putting them into twin mounts. Sensors onboard consisted of a SG surface-search radar and a SK air-search radar.

Although Casablanca-class escort carriers were intended to function with a crew of 860 and an embarked squadron of 50 to 56, the exigencies of wartime often necessitated the inflation of the crew count. They were designed to operate with 27 aircraft, but the hangar deck could accommodate much more during transport or training missions.

== Construction ==
The escort carrier was laid down on 28 December 1942, under a Maritime Commission contract, MC hull 1096, by Kaiser Shipbuilding Company, Vancouver, Washington. She was launched on 26 May 1943; sponsored by Mrs. James McDonald; transferred to the United States Navy and commissioned on 13 September 1943, with Captain William Lehigh Rees in command.

== Service history ==
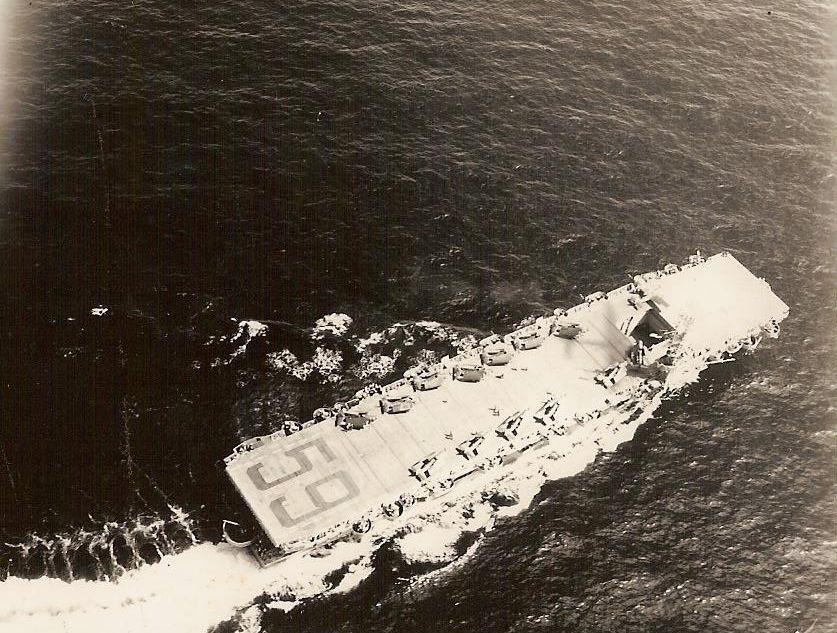
Mission Bay photographed on 23 November 1943, in the Caribbean after passing through the Panama Canal, bound for Portsmouth.

Upon being commissioned, Mission Bay underwent a shakedown cruise down the West Coast to San Diego. She departed San Diego on 15 November bound for the East Coast. Passing through the Panama Canal, arriving at Portsmouth, Virginia on 5 December. There, she was assigned to participate in the Battle of the Atlantic, escorting convoys and hunting German U-boats. She left the East Coast on 26 December, escorting convoys on their way to Casablanca, French Morocco. She arrived on 19 January 1944. She then sailed back, returning to Portsmouth on 8 February.

Her next cruise started on 20 February, when she departed New York City, transporting Army planes and crew, bound for India. Along the way, she made stops at Recife, Brazil, and Cape Town, Union of South Africa. She arrived at Karachi on 29 March, where she unloaded her cargo. She then proceeded back to her home port, arriving back at Portsmouth by 12 May. On 28 May, she departed New York again, ferrying aircraft along with Kasaan Bay and Tulagi, round trip to Casablanca. She arrived on 6 June, departed on 8 June, and arrived back at New York on 17 June. As she entered New York Harbor, she collided with a dredge, which resulted in significant damage to the hull. She arrived at Portsmouth on 22 June, where repairs were conducted throughout the month of July. During this time period, Commander William Ellis Gentner, Jr. took over command of the ship. On 12 July, Captain John Roger Ruhsenberger took command of the ship.

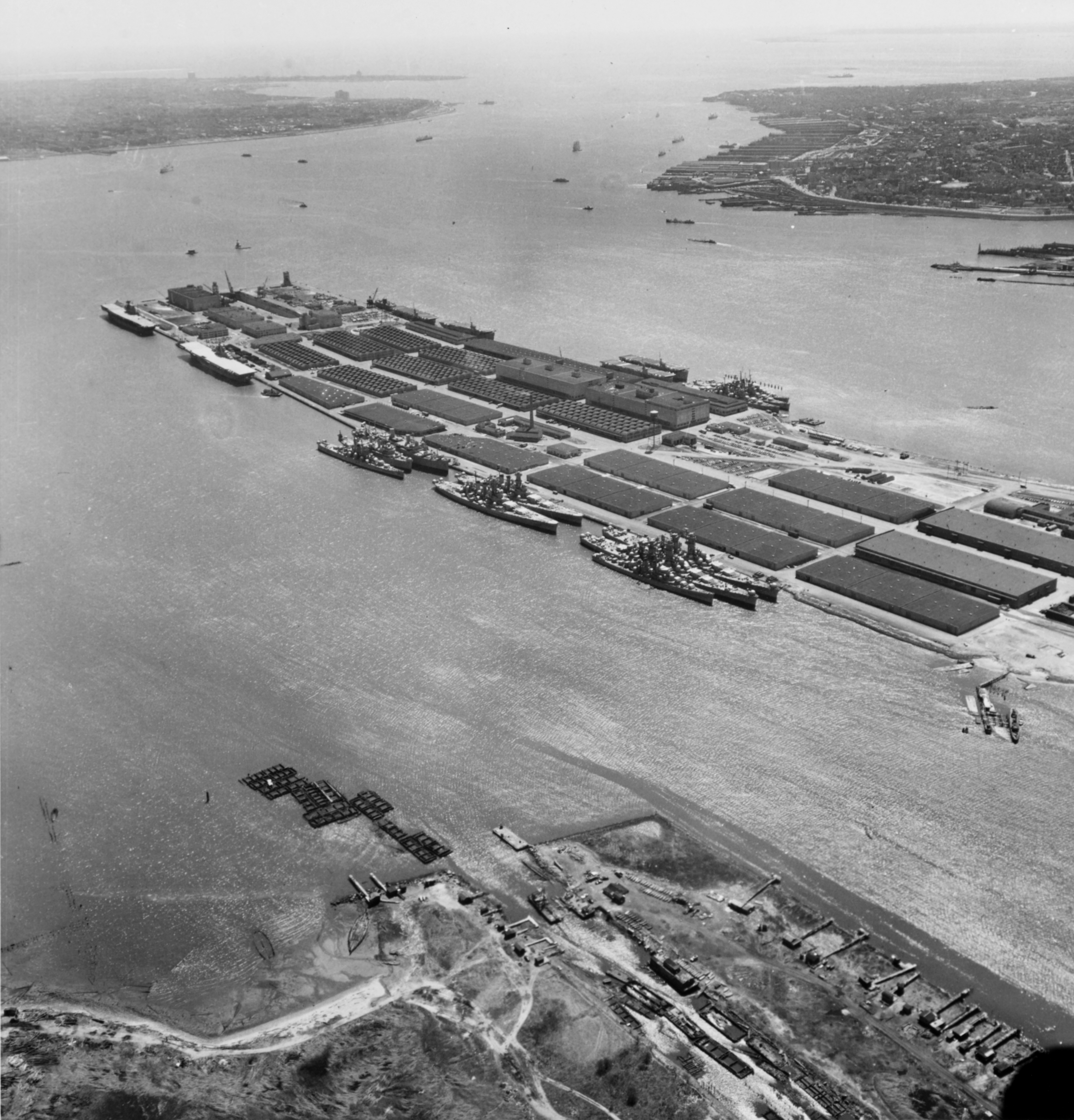
An aerial photograph of ships mothballed at the Bayonne Naval Supply Depot. Mission Bay is visible at the far side of the peninsula, along with several other escort carriers.

On 8 September, she departed, bound for the South Atlantic. After refueling at Dakar, French West Africa on 20 September, she began antisubmarine operations, which lasted throughout the month of November. She arrived back at Portsmouth on 25 November. On 21 December, she left harbor, and proceeded to the Caribbean, where she conducted exercises in the strait between Florida and Cuba. These exercises and miscellaneous tasks took her until February 1945. She was then ordered to sail to Gibraltar, where she would meet the heavy cruiser Quincy which was carrying President Franklin D. Roosevelt and his entourage back from the Yalta Conference. She rendezvoused with the cruiser on 23 February, and escorted the ship as it passed through the open Atlantic. She then left the convoy, mooring at Bermuda on 27 February, before returning to Portsmouth on 9 March.

She departed again on 29 March, and conducted a final antisubmarine sweep of the North Atlantic. Having found no contacts, she anchored off of New York on 14 May. She then cruised off the East Coast, training pilots and conducting pilot qualifications, before she proceeded to Guantanamo Bay on 19 July. She arrived at Quonset Point on 2 August, where she continued training pilots until December, well after the Japanese surrender. On 19 December, she was assigned to the 16th Reserve Fleet, based at Norfolk, Virginia. She was fully decommissioned on 21 February 1947, and mothballed as part of the Atlantic Reserve Fleet, albeit she still stayed with the 16th Reserve Fleet. On 30 November 1949, she was moved up to the Bayonne Naval Supply Depot, New Jersey, where she lay until she was struck from the Navy list on 1 September 1958. She was sold to Hugo Neu Corp on 30 April 1959, and towed to Japan, where she was broken up, starting January 1960.

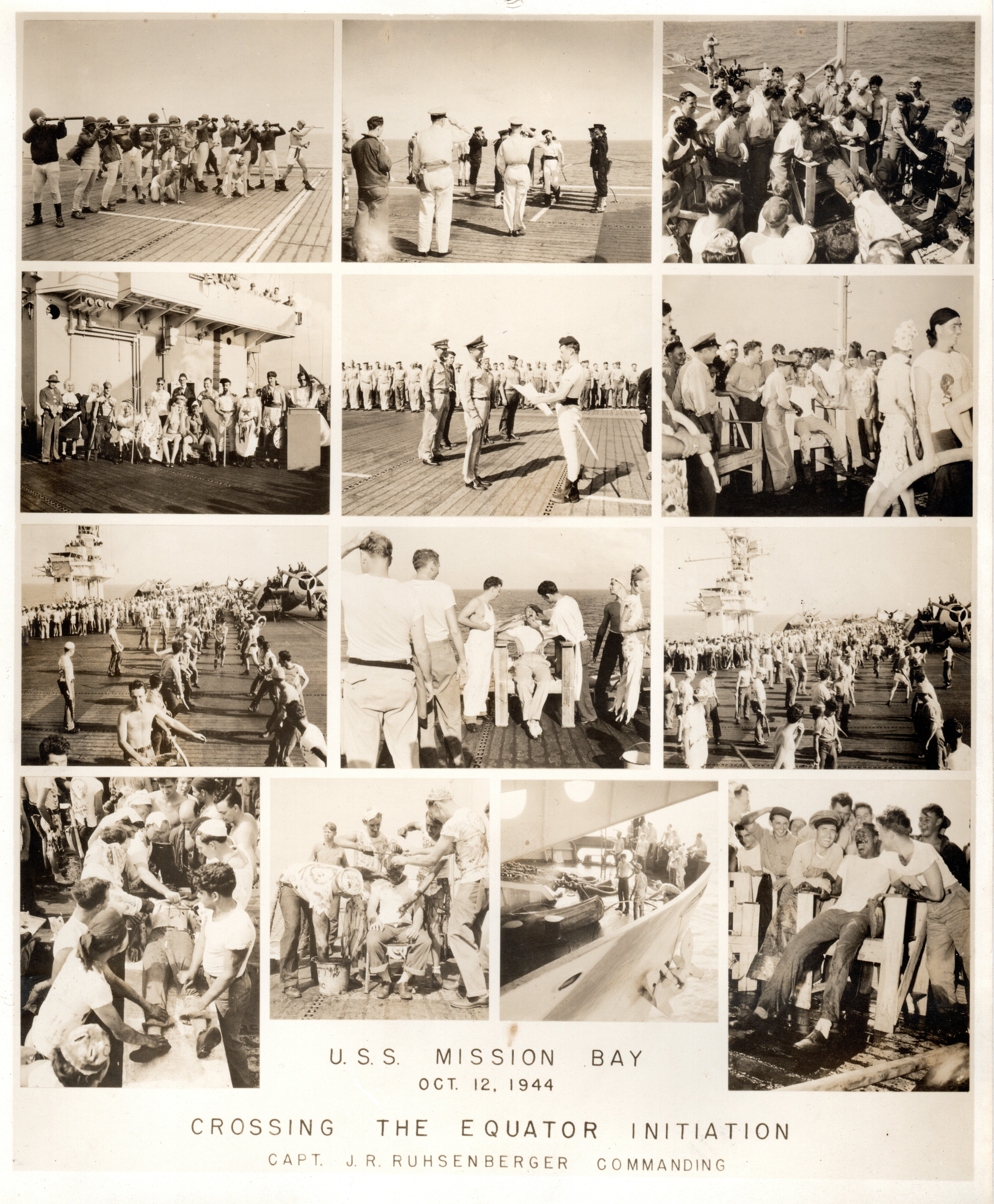
Crossing the Equator Initiation, October 10th, 1944

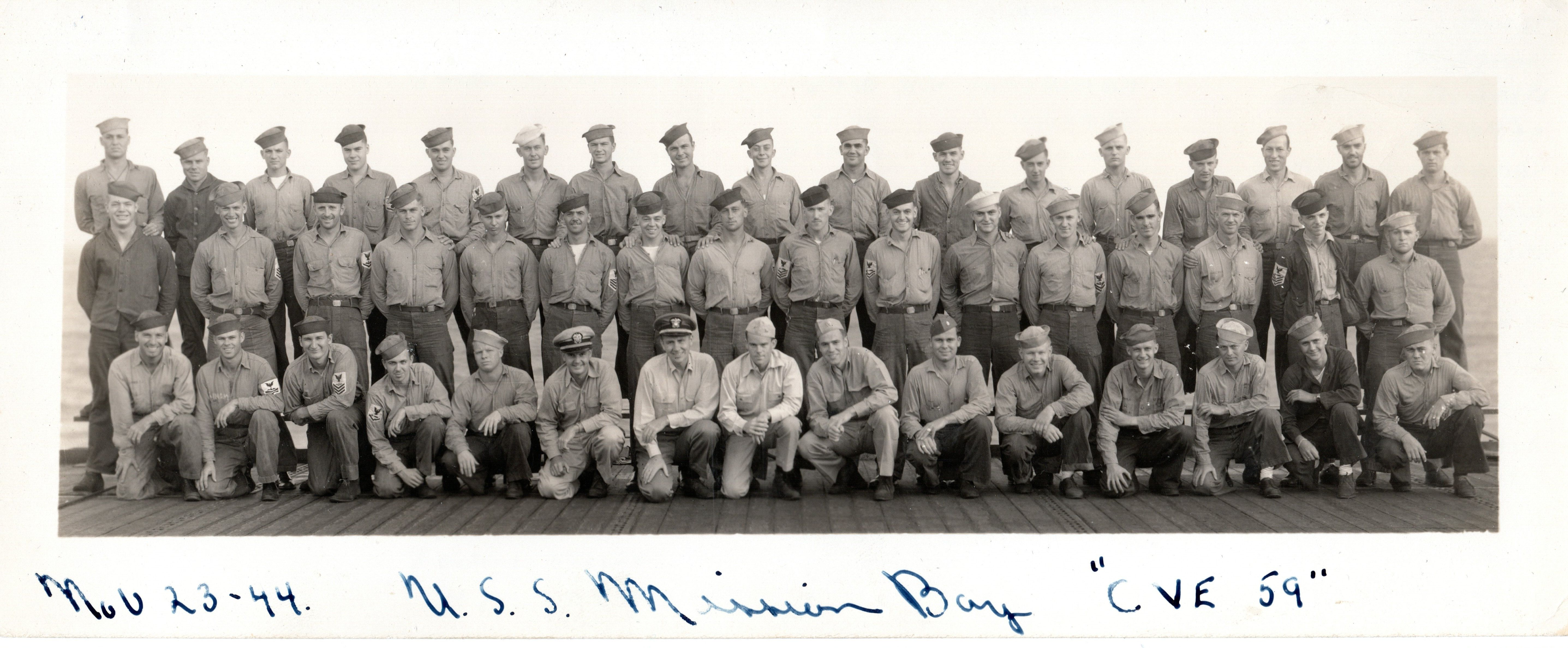
Aviation Ordnance and Mechanics crew of CVE-59 Mission Bay

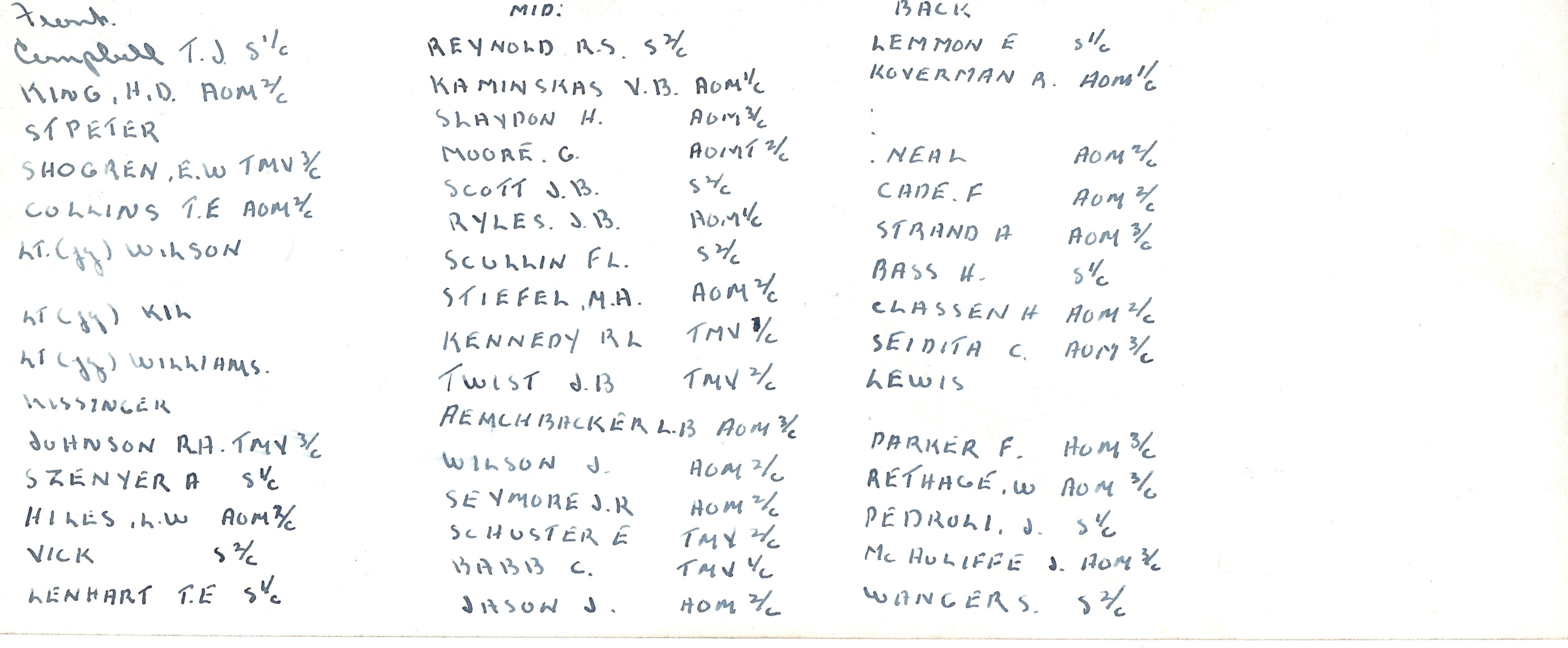
Names from back of crew photo

== Sources ==
=== Online sources ===
- "Mission Bay (CVE-59)". Dictionary of American Naval Fighting Ships. Naval History and Heritage Command. 27 April 2016. Archived from the original on 2 June 2019.
- "Kaiser Vancouver, Vancouver WA". www.ShipbuildingHistory.com. 27 November 2010. Archived from the original on 16 June 2019.

=== Bibliography ===
- Adcock, Al (1996), Escort Carriers in Action - Warships No. 9, Carrollton, Texas: Squadron/Signal Publications, ISBN 9780897473569
- Chesneau, Robert; Gardiner, Robert (1980), Conway's All the World's Fighting Ships 1922–1946, London, England: Naval Institute Press, ISBN 9780870219139
- Friedman, Norman (1983), U.S. Aircraft Carriers: An Illustrated Design History, Annapolis, Maryland: Naval Institute Press, ISBN 9780870217395
- Ross, Al (1993), The Escort Carrier Gambier Bay, Anatomy of the Ship, London, England: Conway Maritime Press, ISBN 9781557502353
- Y'Blood, William (2012), The Little Giants: U.S. Escort Carriers Against Japan, Annapolis, Maryland: Naval Institute Press, ISBN 9781612512471
