= USS Thomas (DE-102) =

Cannon-class destroyer escort

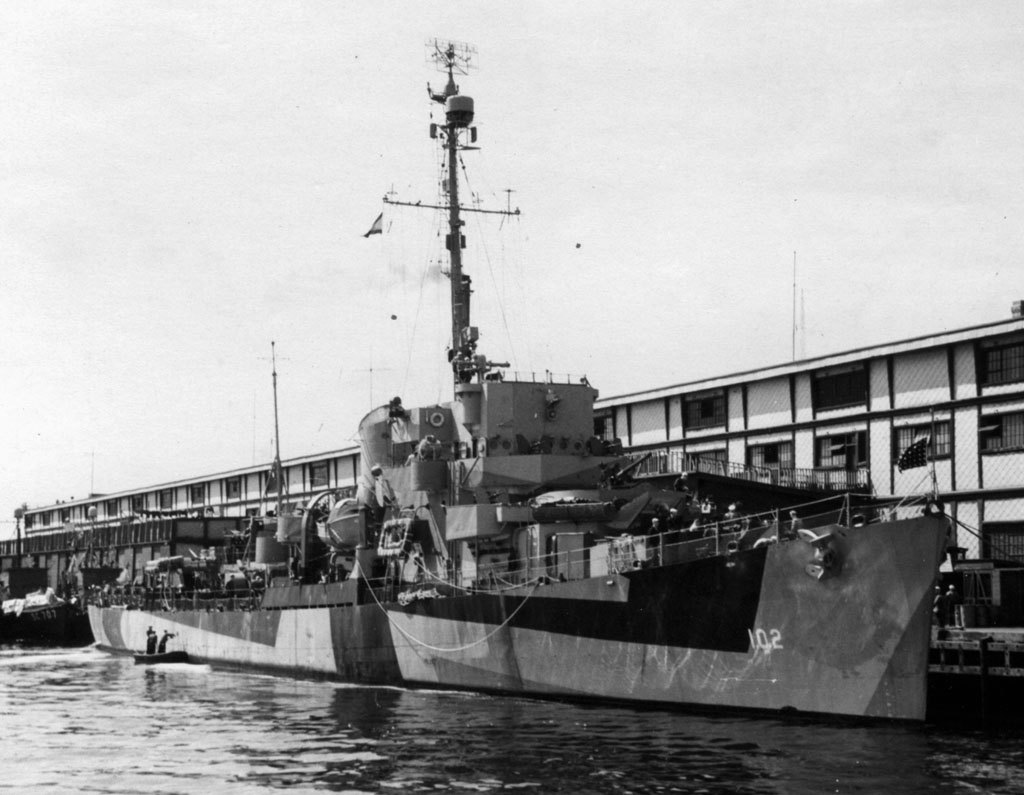
- USS Thomas (DE-102)

History

United States
- Name: USS Thomas (DE-102)
- Namesake: Clarence Crase Thomas
- Builder: Dravo Corporation, Pittsburgh, Pennsylvania
- Laid down: 16 January 1943
- Launched: 31 July 1943
- Commissioned: 21 November 1943
- Decommissioned: March 1946
- Stricken: 22 December 1948
- Fate: Transferred to China, 14 December 1948

History

Taiwan
- Name: ROCS Tai Ho (DE-23)
- Acquired: 14 December 1948
- Out of service: 1972
- Fate: Stricken and scrapped, 1972

General characteristics
- Class & type: Cannon-class destroyer escort
- Displacement: 1,240 tons
- Length: 306 ft (93 m)
- Beam: 36 ft 8 in (11.2 m)
- Draft: 8 ft 9 in (2.7 m)
- Propulsion: 4 GM Mod. 16-278A diesel engines with electric drive; 4.5 MW (6,000 shp), 2 screws
- Speed: 21 knots (39 km/h)
- Range: 10,800 nmi. (20,002 km) at 12 knots (22 km/h)
- Complement: 15 officers, 201 enlisted
- Armament: 3 × 3 in (76 mm)/50 guns (3×1); 2 × 40 mm Bofors AA guns (1x2); 8 × 20 mm Oerlikon AA guns (8×1); 3 × Torpedo tubes for 21-inch Mark 15 torpedo (1×3); 8 × depth charge projectors; 1 × Hedgehog anti-submarine mortar; 2 x depth charge tracks

USS Thomas (DE-102) was a Cannon class destroyer escort in the United States Navy during World War II. She was laid down by Dravo Corp., Pittsburgh, Pa., on 16 January 1943; launched on 31 July 1943; and commissioned on 21 November 1943.

She was the second United States Navy ship to be named after Clarence Crase Thomas.

== History ==
Thomas operated off the east coast during World War II, and was involved in the sinking of three German submarines: U-709, U-233, and U-879. U-233 was rammed by the Thomas after being forced to the surface by depth charges. Thomas rescued 29 survivors, including the Captain.

After being decommissioned at Green Cove Springs, Florida in March 1946, Thomas was transferred to the Republic of China Navy on 29 October 1948 and renamed Tai Ho (DE-23). Her name was deleted from the US Naval List on 22 December 1948.

"Tai Ho" was involved in a standdown on 30 September 1949 with three American merchant ships of the Isbrandtsen Line off Shanghai. This was part of the port closure actions by ROC government against communist controlled ports since June 1949. One American skipper radioed that an "armed ship was menacing" his vessel. Eventually the ROC vessel pulled away without further action.

Tai Ho escaped to Taiwan in 1949 with Nationalist forces. She was stricken from the Republic of China Naval List in 1972 and broken up for scrap.

== Honors ==
DE-102 received four battle stars for World War II service.

Combat Action Ribbon
American Campaign Medal	European-African-Middle Eastern Campaign Medal w/ 4 service stars	World War II Victory Medal
