= HMS Loch Insh =

Frigate of the Royal Navy

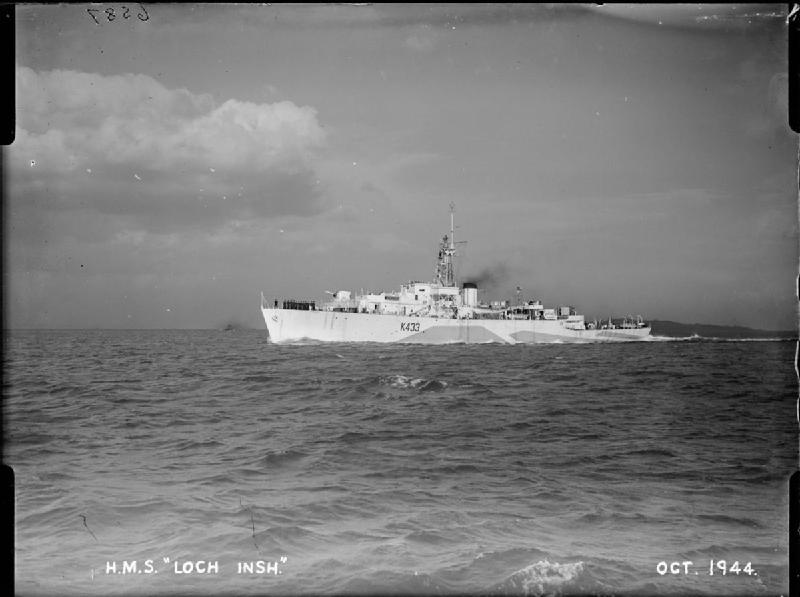
- Loch Insh in October 1944

History

United Kingdom
- Name: HMS Loch Insh
- Namesake: Loch Insh
- Ordered: 25 January 1943
- Builder: Henry Robb, Leith, Scotland
- Yard number: 846
- Laid down: November 1943
- Launched: 10 May 1944
- Completed: 20 October 1944
- Commissioned: November 1944
- Decommissioned: April 1946
- Recommissioned: 21 September 1950
- Decommissioned: 22 June 1962
- Identification: Pennant number K433/F433
- Honours and awards: Atlantic 1944; Arctic 1945
- Fate: Sold to Malaysia in 1963

Malaysia
- Name: KD Hang Tuah
- Namesake: Hang Tuah
- Acquired: 1963
- Commissioned: 1963
- Decommissioned: 1971
- Out of service: 1977
- Identification: F 443
- Fate: Retired and scrapped in 1977

General characteristics
- Class & type: Loch-class frigate
- Displacement: 1,435 long tons (1,458 t)
- Length: 307 ft 9 in (93.80 m)
- Beam: 38 ft 9 in (11.81 m)
- Draught: 8 ft 9 in (2.67 m)
- Propulsion: 2 Admiralty 3-drum boilers; 2 shafts; 4-cylinder vertical triple expansion reciprocating engines, 5,500 hp (4,101 kW)
- Speed: 20 knots (37 km/h; 23 mph)
- Range: 9,500 nmi (17,600 km) at 12 kn (22 km/h; 14 mph)
- Complement: 114
- Armament: 1 × QF 4-inch (100 mm) Mark V gun on 1 single mounting HA Mk.III**; 4 × QF 2-pounder Mk.VII on 1 quad mount Mk.VII; 4 × 20 mm Oerlikon A/A on 2 twin mounts Mk.V (or 2 × 40 mm Bofors A/A on 2 single mounts Mk.III); Up to 8 × 20 mm Oerlikon A/A on single mounts Mk.III; 2 × Squid triple barreled A/S mortars; 1 rail and 2 throwers for depth charges

HMS Loch Insh was a Loch-class frigate of the Royal Navy, named after Loch Insh in Scotland. She was built by Henry Robb of Leith and launched on 10 May 1944. After service at the end of World War II she was decommissioned, but reactivated in 1950 and served, mostly in the Persian Gulf, until 1962. The ship was sold to the Royal Malaysian Navy in 1963 and renamed KD Hang Tuah (F433). She was scrapped in 1977.

== Service history ==
=== World War II ===
After commissioning and sea trials Loch Insh joined the 19th Escort Group at Liverpool in November 1944. The Group was deployed for convoy defence in the North-West Approaches and the Irish Sea. For 14 hours on 6 December Loch Insh and Goodall hunted for the German submarine U-775 off Cape Wrath, but the U-boat, which had torpedoed the frigate Bullen and sent her to the bottom, escaped undamaged.

In January 1945 the Group was transferred to the English Channel for anti-submarine operations. In February it operated in the Irish Sea and South-Western Approaches, and in April was assigned to support the Russian convoys. On 18 April Loch Insh and 19 EG joined the escort for Russian Convoy JW 66, arriving at Kola Inlet on 25 April after an uneventful passage. After anti-submarine operations off the Russian coast, the Group departed with Convoy RA 66 for the return journey.

On 29 April, in the Barents Sea, Loch Insh sank U-307 using "Shark" anti-submarine projectiles and her Squid anti-submarine mortar, and the same day, with frigates Anguilla and Cotton she sank U-286. Loch Insh was detached from RA 66 with the other ships of 19 EG before their arrival in the Clyde and sent to Leith to refit and prepare for foreign service.

On 23 August she departed Rosyth to join the East Indies Escort Force, arriving at Colombo on 25 October. There she acted as escort to repatriation convoys. After a visit to the coast of East Africa, Loch Insh returned to the UK in April 1946 and was decommissioned and placed in Reserve at Devonport. Whilst in Reserve her pennant number was changed to F433.

=== 1950–1962 ===
After a refit Loch Insh was recommissioned on 21 September 1950 to serve with 6th Frigate Flotilla, Home Fleet, for exercises and visits. In April and May 1951 she joined to search for missing submarine Affray.

In April 1952 she was decommissioned and was laid up at Devonport in readiness for a programme of extensive modernisation, of which Loch Insh would be the prototype for the rest of her class. The work finally began in May 1953 and took over a year. Recommissioned on 6 September 1954, she completed her sea trials in the Mediterranean, before arriving at Bahrain in December for duty in the Persian Gulf alongside Loch Alvie. Her primary task was the protection of British tanker shipping, and she carried out a regular routine of patrols and port visits until returning to the UK in August 1955.

After a refit she returned to Persian Gulf patrol duty in March 1956. During the Suez Crisis ("Operation Musketeer") Loch Insh was based at Bahrain where she protected Sitra Oil Jetties. In January 1957 she was relieved by Loch Lomond, and returned to the UK via the Cape of Good Hope, as the Suez Canal was closed. She arrived back at Devonport in March to refit.

In March 1958, after anti-submarine training at Derry, she joined the Home Fleet for exercises and visits, and in June she returned to the Gulf. In October she joined other Royal Navy ships in the multi-national CENTO "Exercise Midlink" in the Indian Ocean, based at Karachi. In March 1959 she made East African coast visits and called at Tanga, Mtwara and Zanzibar before returning to Devonport in April. Loch Insh returned to the Gulf for two further tours of duty from December 1959 to October 1960, and from May 1961 to June 1962.

== Decommissioning and sale ==
Decommissioned on 22 June 1962 Loch Insh was laid up in Reserve. Placed on the Disposal List, she was sold to the Royal Malaysian Navy in 1963. After a refit at Portsmouth, on 2 October 1964 the ship was commissioned into the Royal Malaysian Navy and renamed KD Hang Tuah (F433).

== Bibliography ==
- Boniface, Patrick (2013). Loch Class Frigates. Maritime Books. ISBN 978-1-904459-54-5.
- Colledge, J. J.; Warlow, Ben (2006) [1969]. Ships of the Royal Navy: The Complete Record of All Fighting Ships of the Royal Navy from the 15th Century to the Present (3rd Rev ed.). London: Chatham Publishing. ISBN 978-1-86176-281-8. OCLC 67375475.
- Marriott, Leo (1983). Royal Navy Frigates 1945-1983. Ian Allan Ltd. ISBN 0-71101-322-5.
- Mason, Geoffrey B. (1998). Gordon Smith (ed.). "HMS Loch Insh (K 433) - Loch-class Frigate". naval-history.net.
