= Admiral Davenport =

Admiral Davenport may refer to:

- Dudley Davenport (1919–1990), British Royal Navy rear admiral
- Robert Davenport (Royal Navy officer) (1882–1965), British Royal Navy vice admiral
- Roy M. Davenport (1909–1987), U.S. Navy rear admiral
