= German submarine U-286 =

German World War II submarine

History

Nazi Germany
- Name: U-286
- Ordered: 5 June 1941
- Builder: Bremer Vulkan, Bremen-Vegesack
- Yard number: 51
- Laid down: 3 August 1942
- Launched: 21 April 1943
- Commissioned: 5 June 1943
- Fate: Sunk on 29 April 1945

General characteristics
- Class & type: Type VIIC submarine
- Displacement: 769 tonnes (757 long tons) surfaced; 871 t (857 long tons) submerged
- Length: 67.10 m (220 ft 2 in) o/a; 50.50 m (165 ft 8 in) pressure hull
- Beam: 6.20 m (20 ft 4 in) o/a; 4.70 m (15 ft 5 in) pressure hull
- Height: 9.60 m (31 ft 6 in)
- Draught: 4.74 m (15 ft 7 in)
- Installed power: 2,800–3,200 PS (2,100–2,400 kW; 2,800–3,200 bhp) (diesels); 750 PS (550 kW; 740 shp) (electric)
- Propulsion: 2 shafts; 2 × diesel engines; 2 × electric motors
- Speed: 17.7 knots (32.8 km/h; 20.4 mph) surfaced; 7.6 knots (14.1 km/h; 8.7 mph) submerged
- Range: 8,500 nmi (15,700 km; 9,800 mi) at 10 knots (19 km/h; 12 mph) surfaced; 80 nmi (150 km; 92 mi) at 4 knots (7.4 km/h; 4.6 mph) submerged
- Test depth: 230 m (750 ft); Crush depth: 250–295 m (820–968 ft)
- Complement: 4 officers, 40–56 enlisted
- Armament: 5 × 53.3 cm (21 in) torpedo tubes (four bow, one stern); 14 × torpedoes or 26 TMA mines; 1 × 8.8 cm (3.46 in) deck gun (220 rounds); 2 × twin 2 cm (0.79 in) C/30 anti-aircraft guns

Service record
- Part of: 8th U-boat Flotilla; 5 June 1943 – 31 July 1944; 11th U-boat Flotilla; 1 August – 4 November 1944; 13th U-boat Flotilla; 5 November 1944 – 28 February 1945; 11th U-boat Flotilla; 1 March – 29 April 1945
- Identification codes: M 10 850
- Commanders: Oblt.z.S. Willi Dietrich; 5 June – 29 April 1945
- Operations: 4 patrols: 1st patrol: a. 5 – 18 July 1944; b. 25 – 26 July 1944; c. 7 – 10 August 1944; d. 14 – 16 August 1944; e. 11 – 13 November 1944; 2nd patrol: 18 November 1944 – 7 January 1945; 3rd patrol: 14 January – 24 February 1945; 4th patrol: 18 – 29 April 1945
- Victories: 1 warship sunk (1,150 tons)

German submarine U-286 was a Type VIIC U-boat of Nazi Germany's Kriegsmarine during World War II.

The submarine was laid down on 3 August 1942 at the Bremer Vulkan yard at Bremen-Vegesack as yard number 51. She was launched on 21 April 1943 and commissioned on 5 June under the command of Oberleutnant zur See Willi Dietrich.

She was sunk by British warships on 29 April 1945 off Murmansk.

== Design ==
German Type VIIC submarines were preceded by the shorter Type VIIB submarines. U-286 had a displacement of 769 tonnes (757 long tons) when at the surface and 871 tonnes (857 long tons) while submerged. She had a total length of 67.10 m (220 ft 2 in), a pressure hull length of 50.50 m (165 ft 8 in), a beam of 6.20 m (20 ft 4 in), a height of 9.60 m (31 ft 6 in), and a draught of 4.74 m (15 ft 7 in). The submarine was powered by two Germaniawerft F46 four-stroke, six-cylinder supercharged diesel engines producing a total of 2,800 to 3,200 metric horsepower (2,060 to 2,350 kW; 2,760 to 3,160 shp) for use while surfaced, two AEG GU 460/8–27 double-acting electric motors producing a total of 750 metric horsepower (550 kW; 740 shp) for use while submerged. She had two shafts and two 1.23 m (4 ft) propellers. The boat was capable of operating at depths of up to 230 metres (750 ft).

The submarine had a maximum surface speed of 17.7 knots (32.8 km/h; 20.4 mph) and a maximum submerged speed of 7.6 knots (14.1 km/h; 8.7 mph). When submerged, the boat could operate for 80 nautical miles (150 km; 92 mi) at 4 knots (7.4 km/h; 4.6 mph); when surfaced, she could travel 8,500 nautical miles (15,700 km; 9,800 mi) at 10 knots (19 km/h; 12 mph). U-286 was fitted with five 53.3 cm (21 in) torpedo tubes (four fitted at the bow and one at the stern), fourteen torpedoes, one 8.8 cm (3.46 in) SK C/35 naval gun, 220 rounds, and two twin 2 cm (0.79 in) C/30 anti-aircraft guns. The boat had a complement of between forty-four and sixty.

== Service history ==
U-286 served with the 8th U-boat Flotilla for training from June 1943 to July 1944 and operationally with the 11th flotilla from 1 August. She was then reassigned to the 13th flotilla on 5 November and back to the 11th flotilla on 1 March 1945. She carried out four patrols, sinking one warship of 1,150 tons.

The boat's first patrol was preceded by a short voyage from Kiel on 10 June 1944 to Flekkefjord in Norway (west of Kristiansand).

=== First, second and third patrols ===
U-285's first patrol proper began with her departure from Flekkefjord on 5 July 1944. On the 18th, she was attacked by a Norwegian De Havilland Mosquito of No. 333 Squadron RAF. One man was killed, seven others were wounded. The boat was also damaged, but docked at Kristiansand the same day.

Her second sortie was preceded by a series of short voyages between Kristiansand, Bergen and Horten Naval Base which culminated in Trondheim. This patrol took her three times to the Norwegian Sea and Murmansk, but success continued to elude her. She arrived in Harstad, (northwest of Narvik). on 7 January 1945.

The boat's third foray was relatively uneventful, starting and finishing in Harstad.

=== Fourth patrol and loss ===
The submarine sank the British frigate HMS Goodall in the Kola Inlet 7 nautical miles (13 km; 8.1 mi) from Murmansk on 29 April 1945. Goodall was the last ship of the Royal Navy sunk in the European theatre of World War II. Her success was short-lived; she was attacked and sunk by gunfire from the British frigates HMS Loch Insh, HMS Anguilla, and HMS Cotton in the Barents Sea later that day north of Murmansk at 69°29′N 33°37′E with the loss of her entire crew of 51 men.

Soviet and Russian sources state U-286 was sunk on 23 April 1945 by depth charges from Soviet destroyer "Karl Liebknecht" of Novik-class.

=== Wolfpacks ===
U-286 took part in three wolfpacks, namely:

- Stier (28 November 1944 – 3 January 1945)
- Rasmus (6 – 13 February 1945)
- Faust (16 – 29 April 1945)

== Summary of raiding history ==
Date	Ship Name	Nationality	Tonnage (Note: Merchant ship tonnages are in gross register tons. Military vessels are listed by tons displacement.)	Fate
29 April 1945	HMS Goodall	Royal Navy	1,150	Sunk

== Bibliography ==
- Busch, Rainer; Röll, Hans-Joachim (1999). German U-boat commanders of World War II : a biographical dictionary. Translated by Brooks, Geoffrey. London, Annapolis, Md: Greenhill Books, Naval Institute Press. ISBN 1-55750-186-6.
- Busch, Rainer; Röll, Hans-Joachim (1999). Der U-Boot-Krieg, 1939-1945: Deutsche U-Boot-Verluste von September 1939 bis Mai 1945 [German U-boat losses from September 1939 to May 1945] (in German). Vol. IV. Hamburg, Berlin, Bonn: Mittler. ISBN 3-8132-0514-2.
- Gröner, Erich; Jung, Dieter; Maass, Martin (1991). U-boats and Mine Warfare Vessels. German Warships 1815–1945. Vol. 2. Translated by Thomas, Keith; Magowan, Rachel. London: Conway Maritime Press. ISBN 0-85177-593-4.
- Kemp, Paul (1999). U-Boats Destroyed - German Submarine Losses in the World Wars. London: Arms & Armour. ISBN 1-85409-515-3.
