= Dudley Davenport =

Rear-Admiral Dudley Davenport CB OBE
- Born: 18 August 1919; Alverstoke, Hampshire, England
- Died: 27 December 1990 (aged 71); Portsmouth, Hampshire, England
- Military career
- Allegiance: United Kingdom
- Branch: Royal Navy
- Service years: 1935–1979
- Rank: Rear-Admiral
- Commands: HMS Caesar; HMS Cotton; HMS Holmes; HMS Victorious; Malta Dockyard
- Conflicts: World War II
- Awards: Companion of the Order of the Bath; Commander of the Order of the British Empire

Rear-Admiral Dudley Leslie Davenport CB OBE (17 August 1919 – 27 December 1990) was a Royal Navy officer who became Flag Officer, Malta.

== History ==
Born the son of Vice Admiral Robert Clutterbuck Davenport, Davenport joined the Royal Navy in 1935. He served in World War II and saw action at the Allied invasion of Sicily in July 1943 before becoming commanding officer of the destroyer HMS Caesar in May 1944, commanding officer of the frigate HMS Cotton in June 1945 and commanding officer of the frigate HMS Holmes in September 1945.

After the War he became Director of Seamen Officer Appointments at the Admiralty in June 1962, commanding officer of the aircraft carrier HMS Victorious in October 1964 and Flag Officer, Malta in June 1967.

Military offices
Preceded by Vacant (last held by Viscount Kelburn)	Flag Officer, Malta; 1967–1969	Succeeded by Derrick Kent
