= HMS Anguilla =

Colony-class frigate for United States

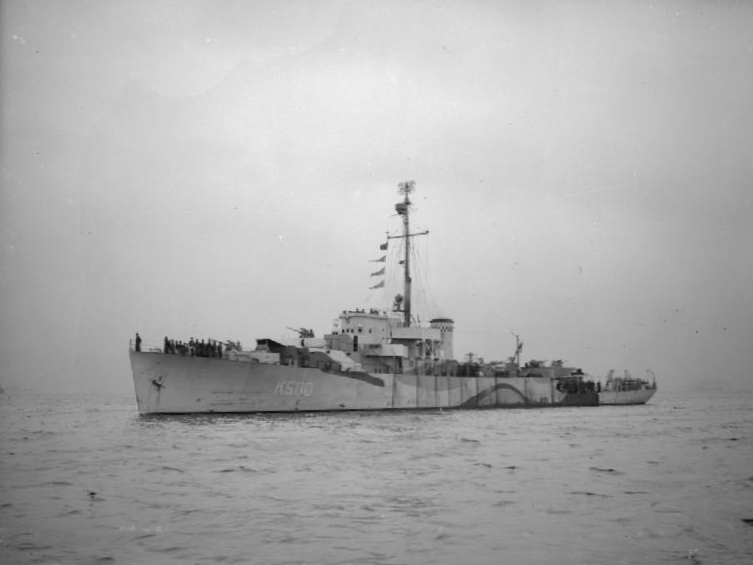
- HMS Anguilla in 1944.

History

United States
- Name: USS Hallowell (PG-180)
- Namesake: Hallowell, Maine
- Builder: Walsh-Kaiser Company, Providence, Rhode Island
- Laid down: 1 April 1943
- Reclassified: Patrol frigate, PF-72, 15 April 1943
- Renamed: Machias, 5 May 1943
- Namesake: Machias, Maine
- Renamed: Anguilla, 10 June 1943
- Namesake: Anguilla
- Launched: 14 July 1943
- Sponsored by: Mrs. John S. MacDonald
- Commissioned: never
- Fate: Transferred to United Kingdom, 15 October 1943
- Acquired: Returned by United Kingdom 31 May 1946
- Fate: Sold for scrapping 13 June 1947

United Kingdom
- Name: HMS Anguilla (K500)
- Namesake: Anguilla
- Acquired: 15 October 1943
- Commissioned: 15 October 1943
- Decommissioned: 1946
- Fate: Returned to United States, 31 May 1946

General characteristics
- Class & type: Colony/Tacoma-class frigate
- Displacement: 1,264 long tons (1,284 t)
- Length: 303 ft 11 in (92.63 m)
- Beam: 37 ft 6 in (11.43 m)
- Draft: 13 ft 8 in (4.17 m)
- Propulsion: 3 × boilers; 2 × turbines, 5,500 shp (4,100 kW) each; 2 shafts
- Speed: 20 knots (37 km/h; 23 mph)
- Complement: 190
- Armament: 3 × single 3 inch/50 AA guns; 2 × twin 40 mm guns; 9 × single 20 mm; 1 × Hedgehog anti-submarine mortar; 8 × Y gun depth charge projectors; 2 × Depth charge racks

HMS Anguilla (K500) was a Colony-class frigate of the United Kingdom in commission from 1943 to 1946 that served during World War II. She originally was ordered by the United States Navy as the Tacoma-class patrol frigate USS Hallowell (PF-72), later renamed USS Machias (PF-72), and was transferred prior to completion.

== Construction and acquisition ==
The ship, originally designated a "patrol gunboat," PG-180, was ordered by the United States Maritime Commission under a United States Navy contract as USS Hallowell. Laid down by the Walsh-Kaiser Company at Providence, Rhode Island, on 1 April 1943, Hallowell was reclassified as a "patrol frigate," PF-72, on 15 April 1943 and renamed USS Machias on 5 May 1943. Intended for transfer to the United Kingdom, the ship was renamed Anguilla by the British on 10 June 1943 and launched on 14 July 1943, sponsored by Mrs. John S. MacDonald.

== Service history ==
Transferred to the United Kingdom under Lend-Lease on 15 October 1943, the ship served in the Royal Navy as HMS Anguilla (K500) on patrol and escort duty until 1946. On 29 April 1945, while escorting Convoy RA 66 outbound from the Soviet port of Murmansk, she joined the frigates HMS Loch Insh and HMS Cotton in sinking the German submarine U-286 in the Barents Sea north of Murmansk at 69°29′00″N 033°37′00″E. The following day, Anguilla was forced to sink with gunfire the British frigate HMS Goodall, which U-286 had heavily damaged.

== Disposal ==
The United Kingdom returned Anguilla to the United States on 31 May 1946. She was sold to Pro-Industry Products of New York City on 13 June 1947 for scrapping.

== Bibliography ==
- Photo gallery of HMS Anguilla at NavSource Naval History
