= HMS Cotton =

Frigate of the Royal Navy

History

United Kingdom
- Name: HMS Cotton
- Builder: Bethlehem-Hingham Shipyard, Hingham, Massachusetts
- Laid down: 2 June 1943
- Launched: 21 August 1943
- Commissioned: 8 November 1943
- Decommissioned: 5 November 1945
- Stricken: 3 January 1946
- Honours and awards: Atlantic, 1939-1945
- Fate: Sold for scrapping, 1946

General characteristics
- Class & type: Captain-class frigate
- Displacement: 1,400 long tons (1,422 t) standard; 1,740 long tons (1,768 t) full
- Length: 306 ft (93 m) o/a; 300 ft (91 m) w/l
- Beam: 36 ft 9 in (11.20 m)
- Draught: 9 ft (2.7 m)
- Propulsion: Turbo-electric; 2 × Foster Wheeler Express "D"-type water-tube boilers; GE 13,500 shp (10,067 kW) steam turbines and generators (9,200 kW); Electric motors 12,000 shp (8,948 kW); 2 shafts
- Speed: 24 knots (44 km/h; 28 mph)
- Range: 5,500 nmi (10,200 km) at 15 kn (28 km/h; 17 mph)
- Complement: 186
- Electronic warfare & decoys: SA & SL type radars; Type 144 series Asdic; MF Direction Finding antenna; HF Direction Finding Type FH 4 antenna
- Armament: 3 × 3 in (76 mm) /50 Mk.22 guns; 1 × twin Bofors 40 mm mount Mk.I; 7–16 × 20 mm Oerlikon guns; Mark 10 Hedgehog anti-submarine mortar; Depth charges; QF 2-pounder naval gun

HMS Cotton (K510) was a Captain-class frigate of the British Royal Navy that served in World War II. The ship was laid down as a Buckley-class destroyer escort at the Bethlehem-Hingham Shipyard at Hingham, Massachusetts on 2 June 1943, with the hull number DE-81, and launched on 21 August 1943. The ship was transferred to the UK under Lend-Lease on 8 November 1943, and named after Admiral Sir Charles Cotton, an officer who served in the American Revolutionary, French Revolutionary and Napoleonic Wars.

== Service history ==
Cotton served as a convoy escort from May to December 1944, operating mostly between Liverpool and Gibraltar. In 1945 she escorted three convoys to the United States, and was part of Russian Convoy JW 66 in April 1945, during which she participated in the sinking of U-286, with Loch Insh and Anguilla on 29 April – the last naval gun battle of the war with Germany. Between 25 June and 29 August 1945 she was commanded by Lt. Dudley Davenport.

Cotton was returned to the U.S. Navy on 5 November 1945, and struck from the Navy List on 3 January 1946, and subsequently sold for scrapping that year.
