= HMS Bullen =

Frigate of the Royal Navy

History

United Kingdom
- Name: Bullen
- Builder: Bethlehem-Hingham Shipyard Inc
- Laid down: 17 May 1943
- Launched: 7 August 1943
- Commissioned: 25 October 1943
- Fate: Sunk on 6 December 1944

General characteristics
- Class & type: Captain-class frigate
- Displacement: 1,190 long tons (1,210 t) (standard)
- Length: 289 ft 5 in (88.2 m)
- Beam: 35 ft 2 in (10.7 m)
- Draught: 10 ft 1 in (3.1 m)
- Installed power: 6,000 shp (4,500 kW) electric motors
- Propulsion: 2 shafts; 4 diesel engines
- Speed: 20 knots (37 km/h; 23 mph)
- Range: 6,000 nmi (11,000 km; 6,900 mi) at 12 knots (22 km/h; 14 mph)
- Complement: 198
- Sensors & processing systems: SA & SL type radars; Type 144 series Asdic; MF Direction Finding; HF Direction Finding
- Armament: 3 × single 3 in (76 mm)/50 Mk 22 guns; 1 × twin Bofors 40 mm; 9 × single 20 mm Oerlikon guns; 1 × Hedgehog anti-submarine mortar; 2 × Depth charge rails and four throwers

HMS Bullen (K 469) was a Captain-class frigate of the Royal Navy during World War II. Originally laid down as BDE-78, a Buckley-class destroyer escort, she was diverted to the Royal Navy and named HMS Bullen before the launch. The ship was sunk by a German submarine in 1944.

== Description ==
The Buckley-class ships had an overall length of 306 feet (93.3 m), a beam of 37 feet (11.3 m), and a draught of 11 feet 3 inches (3.4 m) at full load. They displaced 1,430 long tons (1,450 t) at (standard) and 1,823 long tons (1,852 t) at full load. The ships had a turbo-electric powertrain with two Foster Wheeler Express D boilers providing steam to a pair of General Electric steam turbines which drove two electric generators which sent electricity to two 6,000-shaft-horsepower (4,500 kW) electric motors which drove the two propeller shafts. The destroyer escorts reached a speed of 24 knots (44 km/h; 28 mph) and had enough fuel oil to give them a range of 6,000 nautical miles (11,000 km; 6,900 mi) at 12 knots (22 km/h; 14 mph). Their crew consisted of 220 officers and ratings.

The armament of the Buckley-class ships in British service consisted of three single mounts for 50-caliber 3-inch (76 mm)/50 Mk 22 dual-purpose guns; one superfiring pair forward of the bridge and the third gun aft of the superstructure. Anti-aircraft defence was intended to consisted of a twin-gun mount for 40-millimetre (1.6 in) Bofors anti-aircraft (AA) guns atop the rear superstructure with eight 20-millimetre (0.8 in) Oerlikon AA guns located on the superstructure, but production shortages meant that that two additional Oerlikons sometimes replaced the Bofors guns. A Mark 10 Hedgehog anti-submarine mortar was positioned just behind the forward gun. The ships were also equipped with two depth charge rails at the stern and four "K-gun" depth charge throwers.

== Construction and career ==
BDE-78 was laid down on 17 May 1943 at Hingham, Massachusetts, by the Bethlehem Steel Corp., launched on 17 August 1943. The ship transferred to the United Kingdom on 25 October 1943 and commissioned in the Royal Navy that day as HMS Bullen (K460).

While part of the 19th Escort Group, Bullen was torpedoed by the German submarine U-775 northwest of Strathy Point, Sutherland, Scotland on 6 December 1944, striking her midships. Of the crew of HMS Bullen, 71 died and 97 survived. The wrecksite is designated as a 'protected place' under the Protection of Military Remains Act 1986.
