= HMS Holmes (K581) =

Frigate of the Royal Navy

History

United States
- Name: unnamed
- Builder: Bethlehem-Hingham Shipyard, Hingham, Massachusetts
- Laid down: 27 October 1943
- Identification: DE-572
- Renamed: USS Holmes 1943
- Namesake: British name assigned in anticipation of transfer to United Kingdom
- Launched: 18 December 1943
- Completed: 31 January 1944
- Commissioned: never
- Fate: Transferred to United Kingdom 31 January 1944
- Acquired: Returned by United Kingdom 3 December 1945
- Stricken: 7 February 1946
- Fate: Sold October 1947 for scrapping

United Kingdom
- Name: HMS Holmes
- Namesake: Admiral Sir Robert Holmes (ca. 1622-1692), English naval officer who fought in the Second and Third Anglo-Dutch Wars
- Acquired: 31 January 1944
- Commissioned: 31 January 1944
- Identification: Pennant number K581
- Fate: Returned to U.S. Navy 3 December 1945

General characteristics
- Displacement: 1,400 long tons (1,422 t)
- Length: 306 ft (93 m)
- Beam: 36.75 ft (11.2 m)
- Draught: 9 ft (2.7 m)
- Propulsion: Two Foster-Wheeler Express "D"-type water-tube boilers; GE 13,500 shp (10,070 kW) steam turbines and generators (9,200 kW); Electric motors for 12,000 shp (8,900 kW); Two shafts
- Speed: 24 knots (44 km/h)
- Range: 5,500 nmi (10,200 km) at 15 knots (28 km/h)
- Complement: 186
- Sensors & processing systems: SA & SL type radars; Type 144 series Asdic; MF Direction Finding antenna; HF Direction Finding Type FH 4 antenna
- Armament: 3 × 3 in (76 mm) /50 Mk.22 guns; 1 × twin Bofors 40 mm mount Mk.I; 7–16 × 20 mm Oerlikon guns; Mark 10 Hedgehog antisubmarine mortar; Depth charges; QF 2-pounder naval gun

HMS Holmes (K581) was a Royal Navy Captain-class frigate, originally a Buckley-class destroyer escort intended for the United States Navy. Before she was finished in 1944, she was transferred to the Royal Navy under the terms of Lend-Lease, and was in commission from 1944 to 1945, seeing service during World War II.

== Construction and transfer ==
The still-unnamed ship was laid down as the U.S. Navy destroyer escort DE-572 by Bethlehem-Hingham Shipyard, Inc., in Hingham, Massachusetts, on 27 October 1943. Allocated to the United Kingdom, she received the British name Holmes and was launched on 18 December 1943. She was transferred to the United Kingdom upon completion on 31 January 1944.

== Service history ==
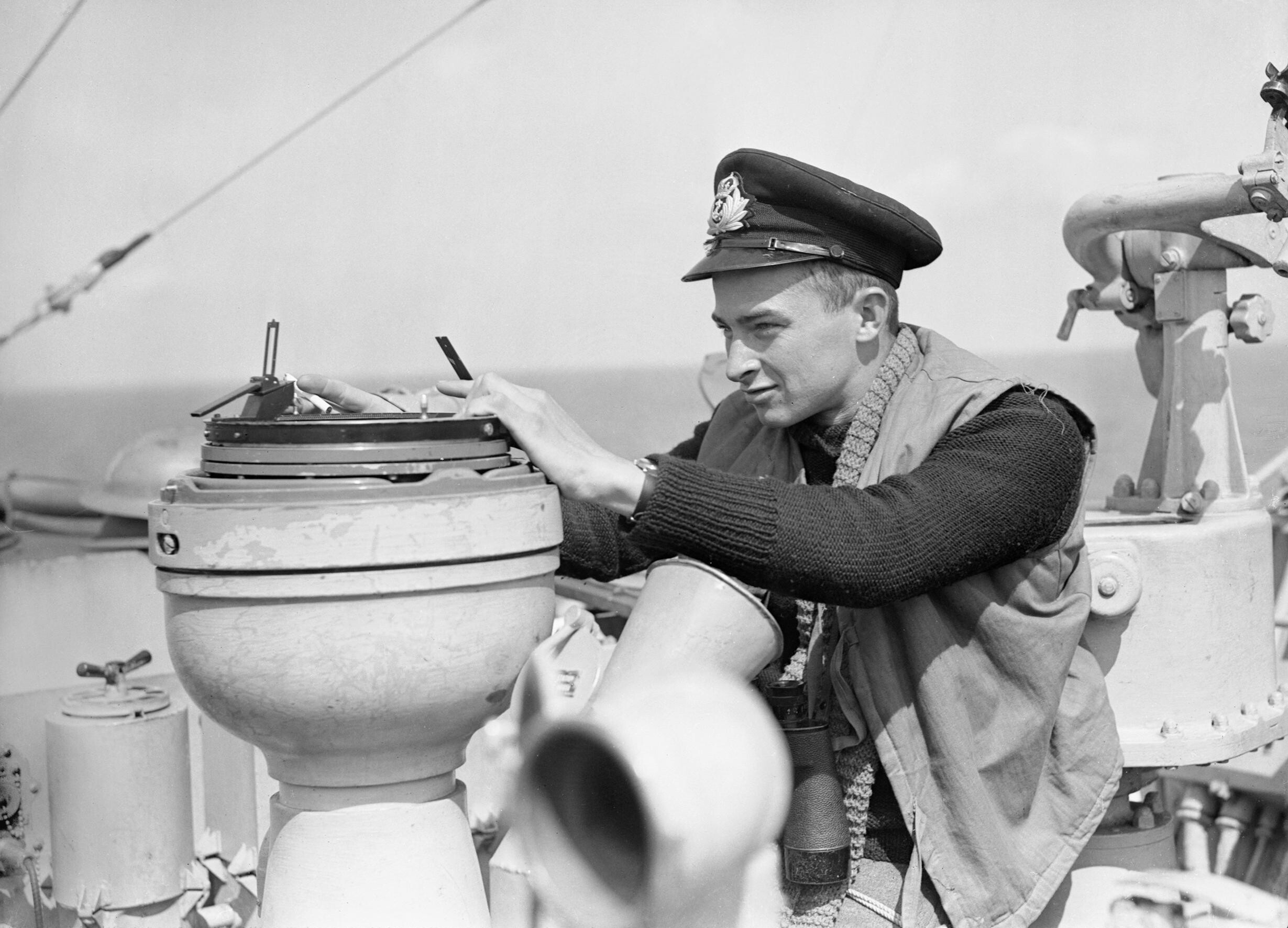
An officer taking a compass bearing aboard HMS Holmes whilst she was guarding Allied supply lines to the Normandy beachhead

Commissioned into service in the Royal Navy as the frigate HMS Holmes (K581) on 31 January 1944 simultaneously with her transfer, the ship served on escort duty for the remainder of World War II. The Royal Navy returned her to the U.S. Navy on 3 December 1945.

== Disposal ==
The U.S. Navy struck Holmes from its Naval Vessel Register on 7 February 1946. She was sold to Walter H. Wilms and Company of Detroit, Michigan, in October 1947 for scrapping.
