= German submarine U-775 =

German World War II submarine

History

Nazi Germany
- Name: U-775
- Ordered: 21 November 1940
- Builder: Kriegsmarinewerft Wilhelmshaven
- Yard number: 158
- Laid down: 22 January 1943
- Launched: 11 February 1944
- Commissioned: 23 March 1944
- Fate: Surrendered on 9 May 1945; sunk as part of Operation Deadlight on 8 December 1945

General characteristics
- Class & type: Type VIIC submarine
- Displacement: 769 tonnes (757 long tons) surfaced; 871 t (857 long tons) submerged
- Length: 67.10 m (220 ft 2 in) o/a; 50.50 m (165 ft 8 in) pressure hull
- Beam: 6.20 m (20 ft 4 in) o/a; 4.70 m (15 ft 5 in) pressure hull
- Draught: 4.74 m (15 ft 7 in)
- Installed power: 2,800–3,200 PS (2,100–2,400 kW; 2,800–3,200 bhp) (diesels); 750 PS (550 kW; 740 shp) (electric)
- Propulsion: 2 shafts; 2 × diesel engines; 2 × electric motors
- Speed: 17.7 knots (32.8 km/h; 20.4 mph) surfaced; 7.6 knots (14.1 km/h; 8.7 mph) submerged
- Range: 8,500 nmi (15,700 km; 9,800 mi) at 10 knots (19 km/h; 12 mph) surfaced; 80 nmi (150 km; 92 mi) at 4 knots (7.4 km/h; 4.6 mph) submerged
- Test depth: 230 m (750 ft); Crush depth: 250–295 m (820–968 ft)
- Complement: 4 officers, 40–56 enlisted
- Armament: 5 × 53.3 cm (21 in) torpedo tubes (four bow, one stern); 14 × torpedoes; 1 × 3.7 cm (1.5 in) Flak M42 AA gun; 2 × twin 2 cm (0.79 in) C/30 anti-aircraft guns

Service record
- Part of: 31st U-boat Flotilla; 23 March – 31 October 1944; 11th U-boat Flotilla; 1 November 1944 – 8 May 1945
- Identification codes: M 00 412
- Commanders: Oblt.z.S. Erich Taschenmacher; 23 March 1944 – 9 May 1945
- Operations: 2 patrols: 1st patrol: 18 November – 21 December 1944; 2nd patrol: 7 February – 30 March 1945
- Victories: 1 merchant ship sunk (1,926 GRT); 1 warship sunk (1,300 tons); 1 merchant ship damaged (6,991 GRT)

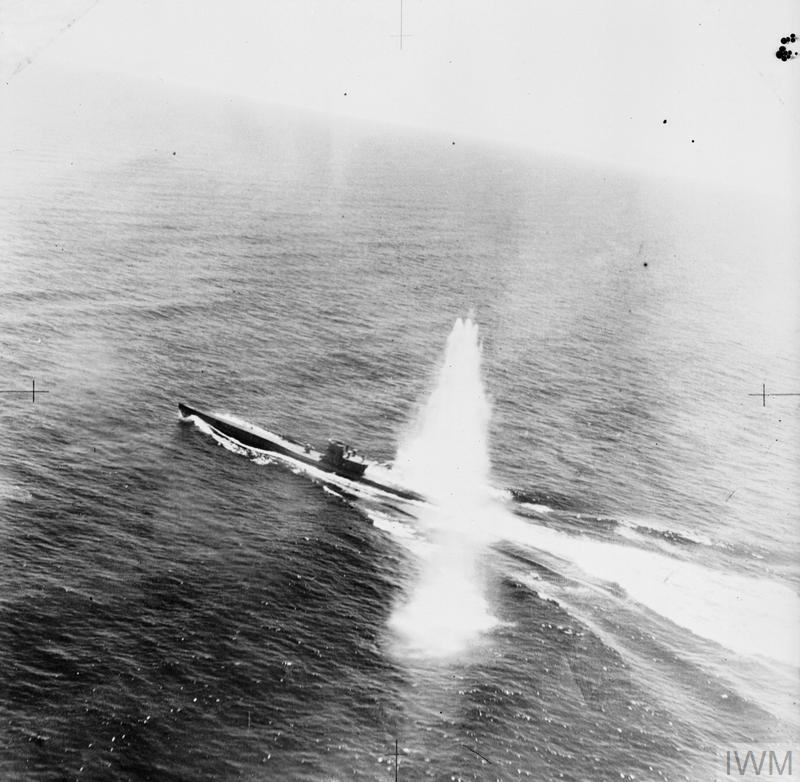
German submarine Type VIIC, U-755, suffers a direct hit from a rocket projectile, while under attack in the Mediterranean Sea north-west of Mallorca from Lockheed Hudson Mark V, AM725 'M', of No. 608 Squadron RAF based at Blida, Algeria. U-755, already damaged as a result of another air attack two days previously, sank in nine minutes with the loss of 40 lives, the first occasion on which a submarine was destroyed by rockets.

German submarine U-775 was a Type VIIC U-boat built for Nazi Germany's Kriegsmarine for service during World War II. She was laid down on 22 January 1943 by Kriegsmarinewerft Wilhelmshaven as yard number 158, launched on 11 February 1944 and commissioned on 23 March 1944 under Oberleutnant zur See Erich Taschenmacher.

== Design ==
German Type VIIC submarines were preceded by the shorter Type VIIB submarines. U-775 had a displacement of 769 tonnes (757 long tons) when at the surface and 871 tonnes (857 long tons) while submerged. She had a total length of 67.10 m (220 ft 2 in), a pressure hull length of 50.50 m (165 ft 8 in), a beam of 6.20 m (20 ft 4 in), a height of 9.60 m (31 ft 6 in), and a draught of 4.74 m (15 ft 7 in). The submarine was powered by two Germaniawerft F46 four-stroke, six-cylinder supercharged diesel engines producing a total of 2,800 to 3,200 metric horsepower (2,060 to 2,350 kW; 2,760 to 3,160 shp) for use while surfaced, two Garbe, Lahmeyer & Co. RP 137/c double-acting electric motors producing a total of 750 metric horsepower (550 kW; 740 shp) for use while submerged. She had two shafts and two 1.23 m (4 ft) propellers. The boat was capable of operating at depths of up to 230 metres (750 ft).

The submarine had a maximum surface speed of 17.7 knots (32.8 km/h; 20.4 mph) and a maximum submerged speed of 7.6 knots (14.1 km/h; 8.7 mph). When submerged, the boat could operate for 80 nautical miles (150 km; 92 mi) at 4 knots (7.4 km/h; 4.6 mph); when surfaced, she could travel 8,500 nautical miles (15,700 km; 9,800 mi) at 10 knots (19 km/h; 12 mph). U-775 was fitted with five 53.3 cm (21 in) torpedo tubes (four fitted at the bow and one at the stern), fourteen torpedoes, one 3.7 cm (1.5 in) Flak M42 and two twin 2 cm (0.79 in) C/30 anti-aircraft guns. The boat had a complement of between forty-four and sixty.

== Service history ==
The boat's career began with training at 31st U-boat Flotilla on 23 March 1944, followed by active service on 1 November 1944 as part of the 11th Flotilla for the remainder of her service.

In two patrols she sank one merchant ship, for a total of 1,926 gross register tons (GRT), one warship sunk (1,300 tons) and one merchant ship damaged (6,991 GRT).

=== Wolfpacks ===
U-775 took part in no wolfpacks.

=== Fate ===
U-775 surrendered on 9 May 1945 in Trondheim, Norway. She was later sunk by gunfire on 8 December 1945 as part of Operation Deadlight.

== Summary of raiding history ==
Date	Ship Name	Nationality	Tonnage (Note: Merchant ship tonnages are in gross register tons. Military vessels are listed by tons displacement.)	Fate
6 December 1944	HMS Bullen	Royal Navy	1,300	Sunk
28 February 1945	Soreldoc	United States	1,926	Sunk
6 March 1945	Empire Geraint	United Kingdom	6,991	Damaged

== Bibliography ==
- Busch, Rainer; Röll, Hans-Joachim (1999). German U-boat commanders of World War II : a biographical dictionary. Translated by Brooks, Geoffrey. London, Annapolis, Md: Greenhill Books, Naval Institute Press. ISBN 1-55750-186-6.
- Busch, Rainer; Röll, Hans-Joachim (1999). Der U-Boot-Krieg, 1939-1945: Deutsche U-Boot-Verluste von September 1939 bis Mai 1945 [German U-boat losses from September 1939 to May 1945] (in German). Vol. IV. Hamburg, Berlin, Bonn: Mittler. ISBN 3-8132-0514-2.
- Gröner, Eric; Jung, Dieter; Maass, Martin (1991). German Warships 1815-1945: U-boats and Mine Warfare Vessels. Vol. 2. Translated by Thomas, Keith; Magowan, Rachel. London: Conway Maritime Press. ISBN 0-85177-593-4.
- Sharpe, Peter (1998). U-Boat Fact File. Great Britain: Midland Publishing. ISBN 1-85780-072-9.
