= HMS Goodall =

Frigate of the Royal Navy

History

United States
- Name: Reybold
- Namesake: U.S. Navy Lieutenant Commander John Keane Reybold
- Ordered: 25 January 1942
- Builder: Boston Navy Yard, Boston, Massachusetts
- Laid down: 20 May 1943
- Launched: 8 July 1943
- Completed: 4 October 1943
- Identification: Hull number: DE-275
- Fate: Transferred to United Kingdom 4 October 1943

United Kingdom
- Name: Goodall
- Namesake: Admiral Samuel Goodall
- Acquired: 4 October 1943
- Commissioned: 4 October 1943
- Identification: Pennant number: K479
- Fate: Sunk 30 April 1945

General characteristics
- Class & type: Captain-class frigate
- Displacement: 1,140 long tons (1,158 t)
- Length: 289.5 ft (88.2 m)
- Beam: 35 ft (11 m)
- Draught: 9 ft (2.7 m)
- Propulsion: Four General Motors 278A 16-cylinder engines; GE 7,040 bhp (5,250 kW) generators (4,800 kW); GE electric motors for 6,000 shp (4,500 kW); Two shafts
- Speed: 20 knots (37 km/h)
- Range: 5,000 nautical miles (9,260 km) at 15 knots (28 km/h)
- Complement: 156
- Sensors & processing systems: SA & SL type radars; Type 144 series Asdic; MF Direction Finding antenna; HF Direction Finding Type FH 4 antenna
- Armament: 3 × 3 in (76 mm) /50 Mk.22 guns; 1 × twin Bofors 40 mm mount Mk.I; 7–16 × 20 mm Oerlikon guns; Mark 10 Hedgehog antisubmarine mortar; Depth charges; QF 2-pounder naval gun
- Notes: Pennant number K479

HMS Goodall (K479) was a British Captain-class frigate of the Royal Navy in commission during World War II. Originally constructed as the United States Navy Evarts-class destroyer escort USS Reybold (DE-275), she served in the Royal Navy from 1943 until her sinking in 1945.

== Construction and transfer ==
The ship was ordered on 25 January 1942 and laid down as the U.S. Navy destroyer escort USS Reybold (DE-275) by the Boston Navy Yard in Boston, Massachusetts, on 20 May 1943. She was launched on 8 July 1943. The United States transferred the ship to the United Kingdom under Lend-Lease upon completion on 4 October 1943.

== Service history ==
Commissioned into service in the Royal Navy as HMS Goodall (K479) on 4 October 1943 simultaneously with her transfer, the ship served on convoy escort duty.

On 29 April 1945, Goodall was escorting Convoy RA 66 in the Barents Sea near the entrance to the Kola Inlet when the German submarine U-968 fired G7es – known to the Allies as "GNAT" – torpedoes at the convoy's escort vessels at 21:00. Goodall sighted one of the torpedoes, which missed her. At about 22:00, the German submarine U-286 hit Goodall at position 69°25′N 33°38′E with a GNAT, causing her ammunition magazine to detonate. The explosion blew away the forward part of the ship and killed Lieutenant Commander Fulton and 94 other crewmen. Goodall's crew abandoned ship, and on 30 April 1945 the British frigate HMS Anguilla (K500) sank U-286 with gunfire.
