= USS Bulmer =

Clemson-class destroyer

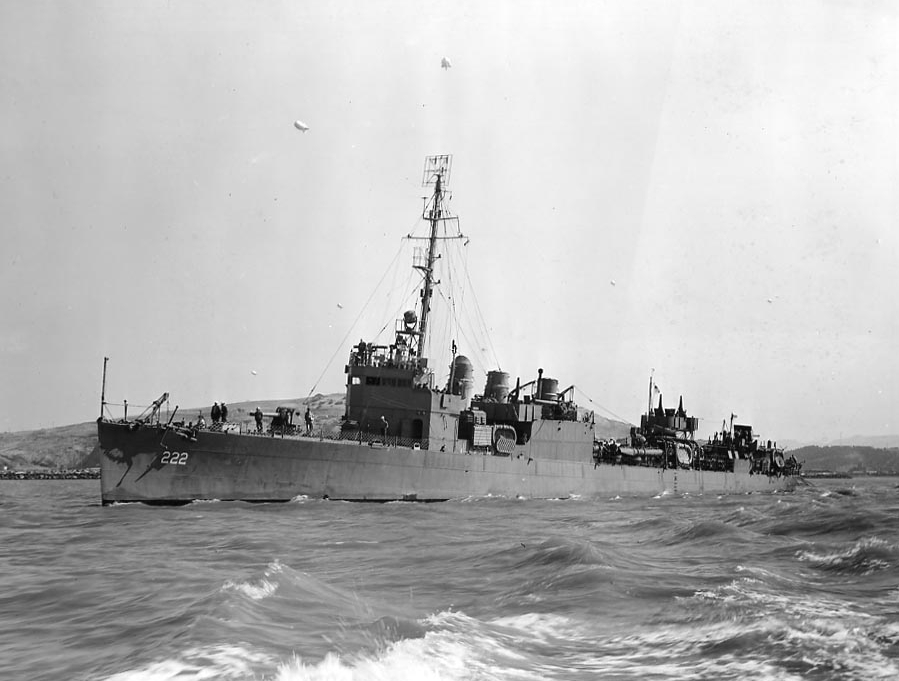
- USS Bulmer (DD-222) underway in August 1943

History

United States
- Namesake: Roscoe Carlyle Bulmer
- Builder: William Cramp & Sons, Philadelphia
- Yard number: 488
- Laid down: 11 August 1919
- Launched: 22 January 1920
- Commissioned: 16 August 1920
- Reclassified: Miscellaneous auxiliary, AG-86, 1 December 1944
- Decommissioned: 16 August 1946
- Stricken: 25 September 1946
- Fate: Sold for scrap 19 February 1947

General characteristics
- Class & type: Clemson-class destroyer
- Displacement: 1,215 tons
- Length: 314 feet 4 inches (95.81 m)
- Beam: 31 feet 9 inches (9.68 m)
- Draft: 9 feet 10 inches (3.00 m)
- Propulsion: geared turbines; 2 screws; 26,500 shp (20 MW)
- Speed: 35 knots (65 km/h)
- Complement: 122 officers and enlisted
- Armament: 4 x 4 in (100 mm) guns, 1 x 3 in (76 mm) gun, 12 x 21 inch (533 mm) torpedo tubes

USS Bulmer (DD-222/AG-86) was a Clemson-class destroyer in the United States Navy during World War II. It was the last warship of the Asiatic Fleet in USN commission.

== Namesake ==
Roscoe Carlyle Bulmer was born on 4 November 1874 in Virginia City, Nevada. He graduated from the United States Naval Academy in 1894. After World War I, he served as United States naval representative at a conference which met at the British Admiralty to consider clearing the seas of mines after the war. On 5 January 1919 he assumed command of that operation. Captain Bulmer died at Kirkwall, Scotland on 5 August 1919.

== Construction and commissioning ==
Bulmer was launched 22 January 1920 by William Cramp & Sons; sponsored by Miss Anita Paor Bulmer, daughter of Captain Bulmer; and commissioned on 16 August 1920.

== Service history ==
=== Inter-War Period ===
In 1920, Bulmer joined the Pacific Fleet, based at San Diego, California. In 1923, she joined the U.S. Naval Forces, Europe, and later the U.S. Naval Detachment in Turkish Waters. Early in 1925, she was assigned to the Asiatic Fleet. She operated as a unit of Destroyer Squadron 5 (DesRon 5), Destroyer Division 14 (DesDiv 14), alternately based in the winter at Manila and Cavite, Philippine Islands, and in the summer at Chefoo, China. Early in 1939, Bulmer was assigned to the South China Patrol and was later reassigned to DesRon 29, DesDiv 58, on Neutrality Patrol under the Commandant, 16th Naval District. In January 1941, she participated in the Asiatic Fleet Problem and then continued patrolling in the Philippines.

=== World War II ===
When the United States entered World War II, Bulmer was still assigned to the Asiatic Fleet and stationed in the Philippines. During the early months of the war she engaged in patrol, escort, and antisubmarine duties throughout the southwest Pacific. On 9 January 1942 Bulmer was one of five destroyers in an escort composed of the cruisers USS Boise (CL-47) and USS Marblehead (CL-12), with the other destroyers USS Stewart (DD-224), USS Pope (DD-225), USS Parrott (DD-218), and USS Barker (DD-213) departing from Darwin to Surabaya escorting the transport Bloemfontein. That transport had been part of the Pensacola Convoy and had left Brisbane 30 December 1941 with Army reinforcements composed of the 26th Field Artillery Brigade and Headquarters Battery, the 1st Battalion, 131st Field Artillery and supplies from that convoy destined for Java.

As a unit of Task Force 5 (TF 5), DesRon 29, Bulmer took part in the Battle of Bali Sea on 4 February 1942, where the allies were defeated. She also took part in the unsuccessful Allied attempt to intercept Japanese invasion convoys off Palembang, Sumatra. On 19 February, along with Barker and Black Hawk, she departed Tjilatjap, Java, for Exmouth Gulf, Australia, and an overhaul.

Bulmer served on patrol duty at various Australian ports until May. She arrived at Pearl Harbor on 16 June and reported to Commander, Service Force, Pacific Fleet, for duty. From June 1942 to May 1943, she operated as an escort vessel for convoys sailing between Pearl Harbor and San Francisco and return.

Bulmer was assigned to the Atlantic Fleet in May and arrived at New York on 14 June. Her first Atlantic assignment was as a unit of Task Group 21.12 (TG 21.12) from 14 June to 22 September. During this sweep of the North Atlantic, aircraft from Core sank U-487 on 13 July.

Bulmer next made a trans-Atlantic voyage to Swansea Wales and then commenced convoy escort duty between northeastern Atlantic ports and North Africa from 4 October 1943 to 31 July 1944. On 13–14 January, during one of these voyages, Bulmer and other escorts made several attacks against a German wolf pack of submarines in the eastern Atlantic. Bulmer conducted her attacks very aggressively and although not officially credited there is a chance that she sank or severely damaged U-377. On the morning of 14 January, under the command of Lt. Cdr. George Towne Baker (USNA,'35), she rescued 17 German survivors, including the captain, of a sunken German submarine believed to have been U-231, which was sunk on 13 January by a British flying boat. (On at least one occasion after the war, at a reunion of the officers and crew of the Bulmer, the German captain attended. When he was no long able to travel, his daughter attended a reunion. "Had it not been for the rescue of my father, I would not have been born.")

From 1 August to 4 October 1944, she conducted operations in Narragansett Bay. Bulmer's designation was changed to AG-86 on 1 December. She reported to the Panama Canal Zone on 27 December for training duty with newly commissioned submarines. In July 1945, she returned to the United States and was assigned to the operational control of Commander, Air Force, Atlantic Fleet, and operated out of Port Everglades, Florida. Bulmer was decommissioned on 16 August 1946 and sold on 19 February 1947.

== Awards ==
She received two battle stars for her World War II service.

As of 2005, no other ship has been named Bulmer.
