= USS Barker =

Clemson-class destroyer

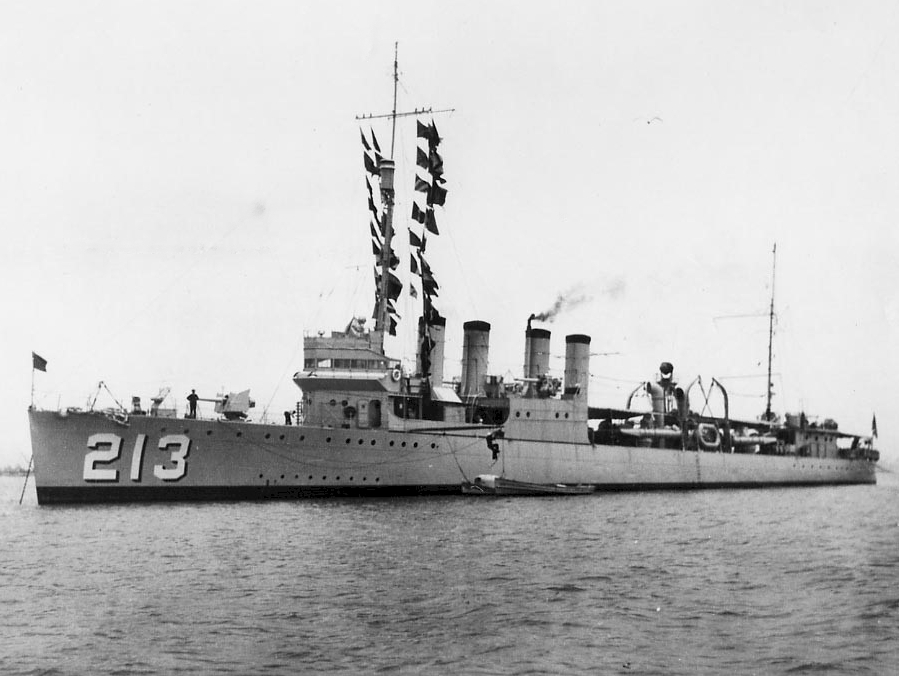
- USS Barker in 1928

History

United States
- Namesake: Albert S. Barker
- Builder: William Cramp & Sons, Philadelphia
- Cost: $892,808 (hull and machinery)
- Yard number: 479
- Laid down: 30 April 1919
- Launched: 11 September 1919
- Commissioned: 27 December 1919
- Decommissioned: 18 July 1945
- Stricken: 13 August 1945
- Fate: Sold 30 November 1945

General characteristics
- Class & type: Clemson-class destroyer
- Displacement: 1,215 tons
- Length: 314 feet 4 inches (95.81 m)
- Beam: 31 feet 8 inches (9.65 m)
- Draft: 9 feet 10 inches (3.00 m)
- Propulsion: 26,500 shp (20 MW); geared turbines, 2 screws
- Speed: 35 knots (65 km/h)
- Complement: 132 officers and enlisted
- Armament: 4 x 102 mm (4.0 in) guns, 1 x 76 mm (3.0 in) gun, 12 x 21 inch (533 mm) Torpedoes.

USS Barker (DD-213) was a Clemson-class destroyer in the United States Navy in World War II, named for Admiral Albert S. Barker.

Barker was launched 11 September 1919 by William Cramp & Sons, Philadelphia; sponsored by Mrs. Albert S. Barker widow of Admiral Barker; and commissioned 27 December 1919.

== Pre-war service ==
In June 1920, Barker sailed to the Middle East to join Division 35, US Naval Detachment, Turkish Waters. She served for several months with the American Relief of Armenia and visited several ports in Turkey and the Middle East before sailing eastward late in 1921, to the Orient to commence her four-year tour of duty with the Asiatic Fleet.

Barker cruised in Philippine and Asiatic waters until departing Manila in May 1925. In the next two years she served with the Scouting Force on the east coast and patrolled off Nicaragua, 10–31 January 1927, in the second campaign there. Thereafter, she served a two-year tour with United States Naval Forces Europe, and carried out several goodwill visits to many European ports.

From August 1929 to December 1941 Barker was kept on the Asiatic Station and operated with the destroyer divisions of the Asiatic Fleet. In periods of disturbance in China she was engaged in protecting American interests.

== SS President Hoover ==
In the small hours of 11 December 1937 the ocean liner SS President Hoover ran aground in a typhoon on Kasho-to, east of Formosa. Barker was sent from Olongapo Naval Station and USS Alden was sent from Manila to assist. The two destroyers struggled through heavy seas at only 12 knots (22 km/h) and did not arrive until 1245 hrs the next day, by which time Hoover's 330 crew were most of the way through getting their 503 passengers and themselves ashore safely. However, a few of the crew plundered the liner's liquor store, got drunk, and once ashore started pursuing some of the women passengers. A party from Alden boarded Hoover to protect valuables, and landing parties from both Alden and Barker went ashore to restore order.

== Second World War ==
On 7 December 1941, Barker was at Tarakan, Borneo, and upon receipt of the news of the Pearl Harbor attack, immediately commenced patrolling the surrounding area. For the remainder of December and throughout January 1942, she patrolled and escorted convoys in the Netherlands East Indies. On 9 January 1942 Barker was one of five destroyers in an escort composed of the cruisers USS Boise (CL-47) and USS Marblehead (CL-12), with the other destroyers USS Stewart (DD-224), USS Bulmer (DD-222), USS Parrott (DD-218), and USS Pope (DD-225) departing from Darwin to Surabaya escorting the transport Bloemfontein. That transport had been part of the Pensacola Convoy and had left Brisbane 30 December 1941 with Army reinforcements composed of the 26th Field Artillery Brigade and Headquarters Battery, the 1st Battalion, 131st Field Artillery and supplies from that convoy destined for Java.

In February Barker took part in the abortive attempts to stem the Japanese advance into the Dutch East Indies. She participated in the anti-aircraft actions off Bali (4 February 1942) and Banka Island (15 February). Barker was damaged by near misses in the action of 15 February, and required emergency repairs. She retired to Exmouth Gulf, Australia, arriving 19 February for repair and overhaul.

Between March and May 1942, Barker operated out of Fremantle, Australia, on patrol and escort duty. She then sailed to Tongatapu where she arrived 24 May. Remaining there until 29 June, she then proceeded to Pearl Harbor via Samoa and New Caledonia. In August, she proceeded to Mare Island Navy Yard where she underwent overhaul. Between October 1942 and May 1943, Barker escorted convoys between San Francisco, California and Pearl Harbor.

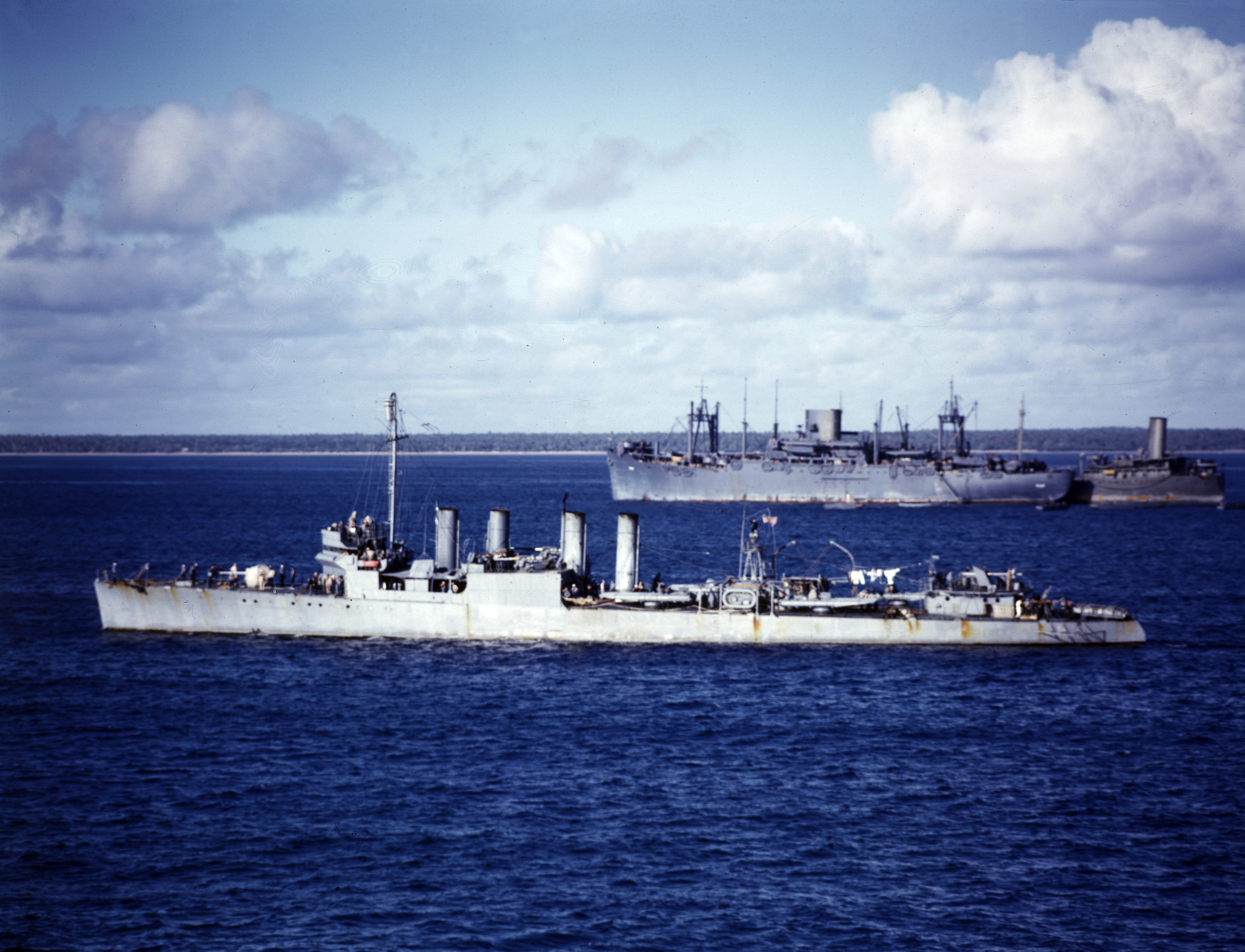
Barker and USS President Jackson (APA-18) at Tongatabu, 21 July 1942.

She departed San Diego 23 May 1943 for the east coast, arriving at Casco Bay, Maine, 2 June. On 27 June, as a member of the hunter killer TG 21.12 (Core group), she departed New York to search for enemy submarines in the Atlantic. When U-487 was sunk by aircraft from Core (CVE-13) on 13 July, Barker rescued 33 survivors. Returning to New York on 1 August, Barker departed with the Group on another anti-submarine sweep on 16 August. On 24 August Core's aircraft found and sank U-604 and U-185. Barker rescued 36 survivors of U-185 and 9 from U-604

Between 6 September 1943 and 1 October 1944, Barker made two trans-Atlantic convoy escort crossings to England and four to North Africa. The remainder of Barker's active service was performed as a convoy escort in the Caribbean, to Newfoundland, and along the eastern seaboard of the United States. She arrived at Philadelphia 4 June 1945, was decommissioned 18 July, and sold 30 November 1945.

== Awards ==
Barker received two battle stars for her participation in World War II.

As of 2013, no other US Navy ship has been named Barker.
