= Albert S. Barker =

US Navy admiral (1843–1916)

Albert Smith Barker
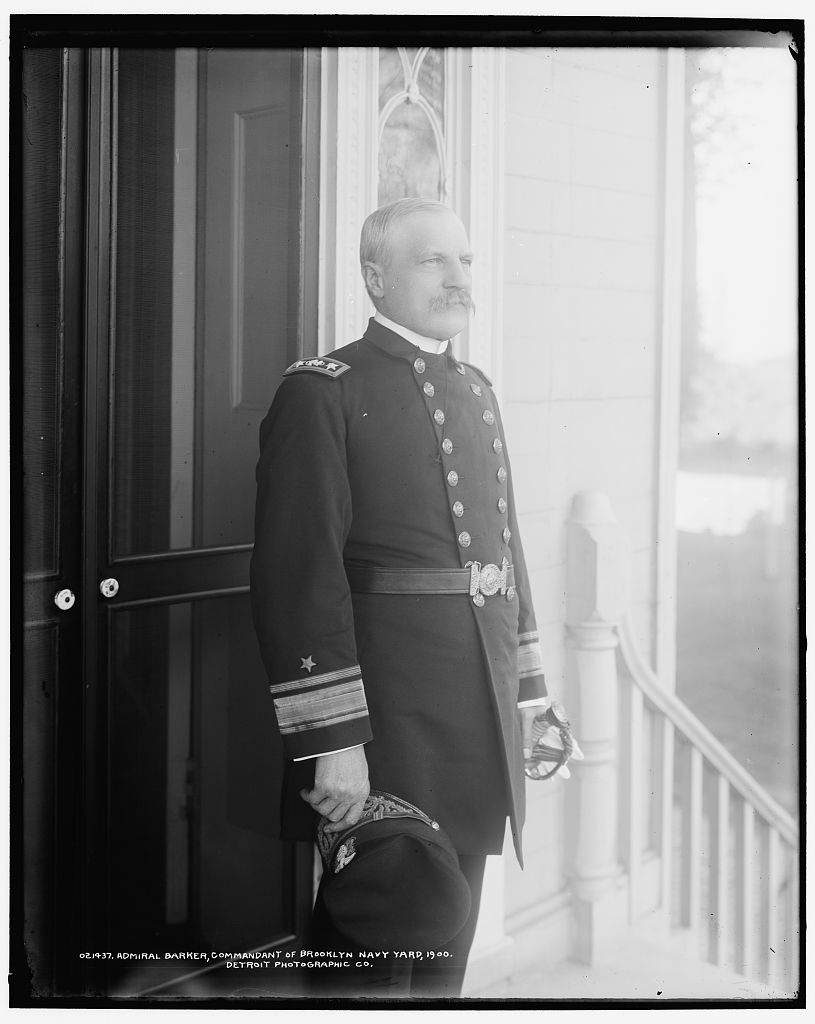
- Albert Smith Barker in 1900
- Born: March 31, 1843; Hanson, Massachusetts, U.S.
- Died: January 30, 1916 (aged 72); Washington, D.C., U.S.
- Burial place: Arlington National Cemetery
- Military career
- Allegiance: United States of America
- Branch: United States Navy
- Service years: 1859–1905
- Rank: Rear Admiral
- Commands: North Atlantic Fleet; New York Navy Yard; Norfolk Navy Yard; Asiatic Squadron (Interim); USS Oregon; USS Newark; USS Philadelphia; USS Enterprise
- Conflicts: American Civil War; Spanish–American War

Albert Smith Barker (March 31, 1843 – January 30, 1916) was an admiral in the United States Navy who served during the American Civil War and the Spanish–American War.

== Biography ==
Barker was born on March 31, 1843, in Hanson, Massachusetts, the son of Josiah and Eliza (Cushing) Barker. He entered the U.S. Naval Academy in October 1859 at the age of sixteen and was graduated in May 1861 after the outbreak of the Civil War. Barker initially served as a midshipman aboard the Mississippi, was commissioned as an ensign in November 1862 and survived its sinking in March 1863. He later served on Monongahela and Niagara during the Civil War.

In July 1883, Albert Barker was commander of the screw-sloop USS Enterprise while on the East Coast of Africa at Zanzibar. He wrote a report on the "Trade of Zanzibar" of imports and exports for the years 1882–83. The trade of the port principally being with the United States, England, Germany, and France. Many vessels from these countries were employed in this trade process with America, such as the British man-of-war HMS London stationed at Zanzibar as a store ship.

From May 1892 to August 1894, Barker was commander of the cruiser USS Philadelphia.

On October 26, 1894, Barker married Mary Ellen (Blackmar) Maxwell (1852–1938), the widow of a religious missionary who died in 1890 while the couple was in India. She was an author of three novels under the name Ellen Blackmar Maxwell.

From March 1896 to January 1897, Barker was commander of the battleship USS Oregon.

During the Spanish–American War, Barker commanded the cruiser USS Newark and participated in the bombardment of Santiago on July 1, 1898. In August 1898, he again became commander of the Oregon. In 1899, Barker briefly served as Commander-in-Chief of the Asiatic Squadron.

Barker served as commandant of the Norfolk Navy Yard from 1899 to 1900 and commandant of the New York Navy Yard from 1900 to 1903. He was Commander-in-Chief of the North Atlantic Fleet from April 1, 1903, to March 31, 1905.

Rear Admiral Barker died of pneumonia on January 30, 1916, at his home in Washington, D.C. Barker and his wife are buried at Arlington National Cemetery.

== Recognition ==
The destroyer USS Barker (DD-213) was named for him.

== Gallery ==
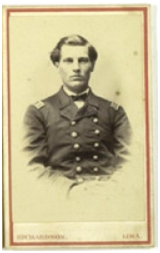
Barker as a Lieutenant, 1864

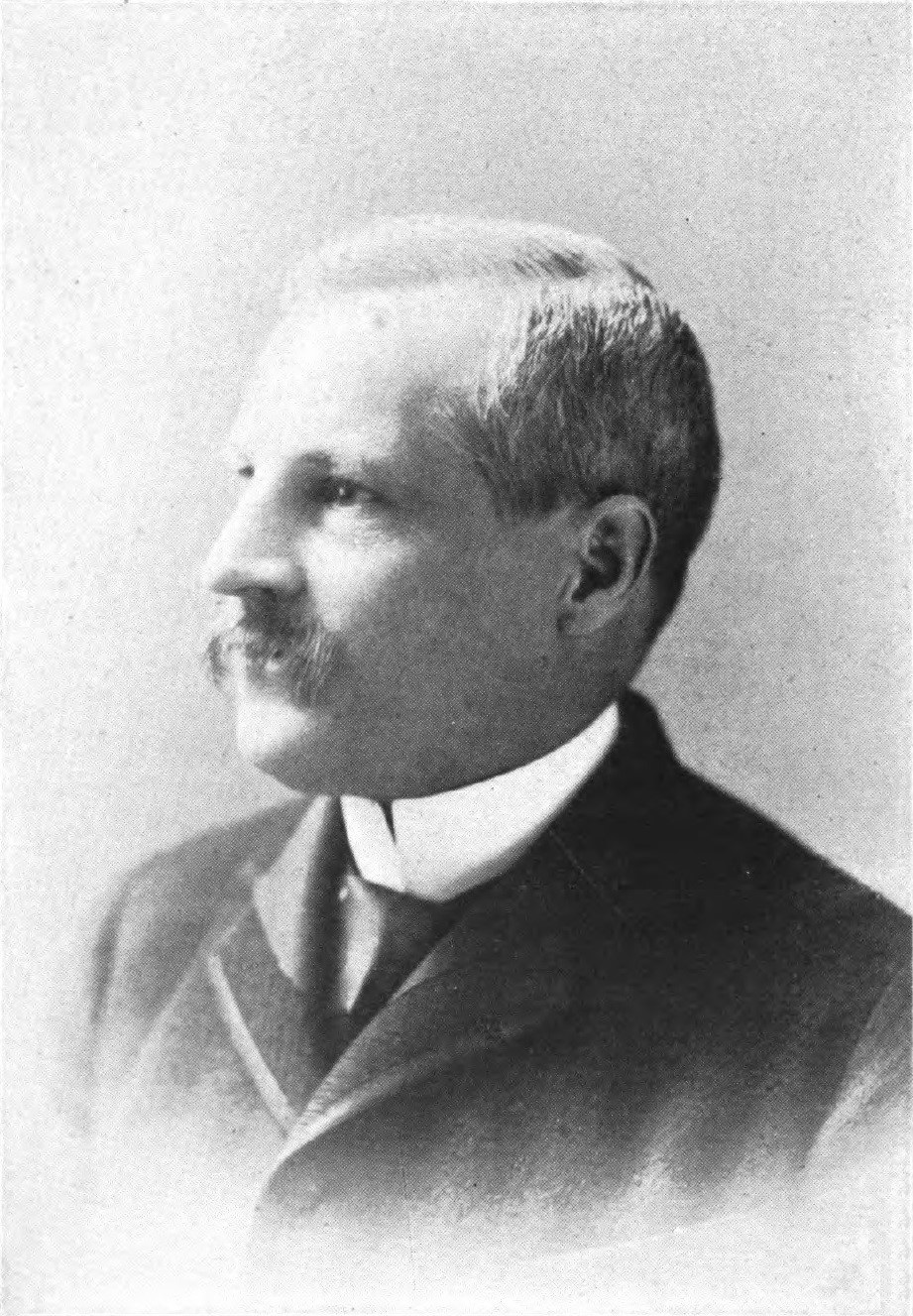
Barker as Rear Admiral, no later than 1901

== Dates of rank ==
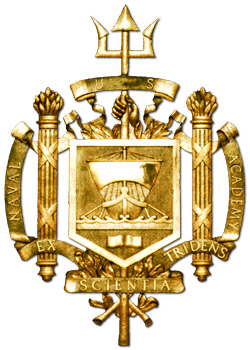
United States Naval Academy Midshipman – Class of 1863, graduated May 1861

Ensign	Lieutenant	Lieutenant Commander
O-1	O-3	O-4
November 25, 1862	February 22, 1864	July 25, 1866

Commander	Captain	Rear Admiral
O-5	O-6	O-8
March 28, 1877	May 5, 1892	October 10, 1899

Barker never held the rank of LTJG (O-2) due to it not being created until later years. As well, Rear Admiral then is equivalent to today's Rear Admiral (Upper Half).

== Attribution ==
Military offices
Preceded by Francis J. Higginson	Commander-in-Chief, North Atlantic Fleet; July 1903 – March 1905	Succeeded by Robley D. Evans
