= Thomas Smith (Medal of Honor, 1878) =

- Born: 1856; Ireland
- Died: Unknown
- Military career
- Allegiance: United States of America
- Branch: United States Navy
- Rank: Seaman
- Unit: USS Enterprise
- Awards: Medal of Honor

Thomas Smith (born 1856, date of death unknown) was a United States Navy sailor and a recipient of the United States military's highest decoration, the Medal of Honor.

Born in 1856 in Ireland, Smith emigrated to the United States and joined the Navy from Virginia. By October 1, 1878, he was serving as a seaman on the USS Enterprise. On that day, while Enterprise was off the coast of Pará, Brazil, he rescued Coxswain William Kent from drowning. For this action, he was awarded the Medal of Honor.

Smith's official Medal of Honor citation reads:

For rescuing from drowning William Kent, coxswain of the U.S.S. Enterprise, off Para, Brazil, 1 October 1878.

== See also ==
- List of Medal of Honor recipients during peacetime
