= USS Enterprise (1874) =

Sloops-of-war of the United States Navy

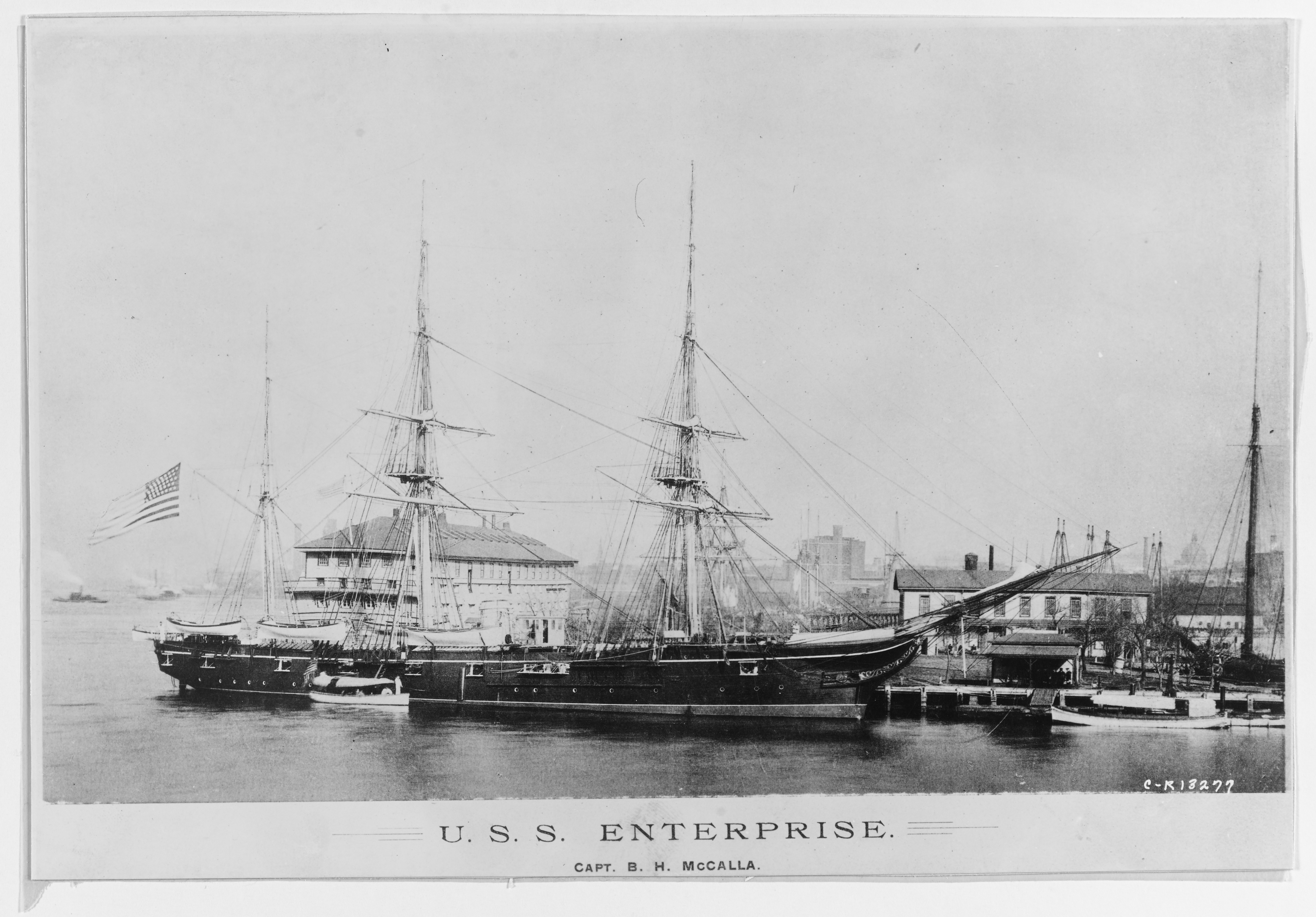
- USS Enterprise circa 1890 at the New York Navy Yard.

History

United States
- Name: USS Enterprise
- Builder: John W. Griffiths
- Launched: 13 June 1874
- Commissioned: 16 March 1877
- Decommissioned: 9 May 1880
- Recommissioned: 12 January 1882
- Decommissioned: 21 March 1886
- Recommissioned: 8 July 1890
- Decommissioned: 4 May 1909
- Fate: Sold 1 October 1909; Burned for Salvage near Boston 1910

General characteristics
- Displacement: 1,375 tons
- Length: 185 ft (56 m)
- Beam: 35 ft (11 m)
- Draft: 14 ft 3 in (4.34 m)
- Propulsion: Sail and steam
- Speed: 11 knots (20 km/h)
- Complement: 184
- Armament: 1 × 11-inch smoothbore, 4 × 9-inch, 1 × 60-pounder

The fifth USS Enterprise, a barque-rigged screw sloop, was launched 13 June 1874 at Portsmouth Navy Yard, Kittery, Maine, US, by John W. Griffiths, a private contractor; and commissioned 16 March 1877, Commander George C. Remey in command. She was later commanded by Bowman H. McCalla around 1890, followed by Commander Albert S. Barker from 1892 to 1896.

== Overview ==
Enterprise's first duty after fitting out at Norfolk, Virginia, took her to the mouth of the Mississippi River for surveying operations. Returning to Norfolk in April 1878, she remained there only briefly, sailing 27 May for surveying duty up the Amazon and Madeira Rivers. On 1 October 1878 off the coast of Pará, Brazil, Seaman Thomas Smith rescued a fellow sailor from drowning, for which he was awarded the Medal of Honor. This surveying duty completed, she repaired at New York City, then in December 1878 joined the U.S. naval forces in European waters, calling at numerous ports in northern Europe and in the Mediterranean. She returned to the Washington Navy Yard on 9 May 1880 and was placed out of commission.

Recommissioned on 12 January 1882, she cruised the east coast until 1 January 1883 when she sailed on a three-year hydrographic survey that took her completely around the world. During this time, she was commanded by Albert S. Barker. Her findings on this cruise added materially to the knowledge of the oceans, their currents, and their bottoms. During the journey she was a neutral witness of the Battle of Fuzhou on 23 August 1884 during the Sino-French War. Enterprise was decommissioned at New York on 21 March 1886.

Placed back in commission on 4 October 1887, Enterprise sailed from Boston in January 1888 for two years in the waters of Europe, the Mediterranean, and the east coast of Africa, where she showed the flag and looked out for United States' interests. She returned to New York in March 1890 and was decommissioned on 20 May.

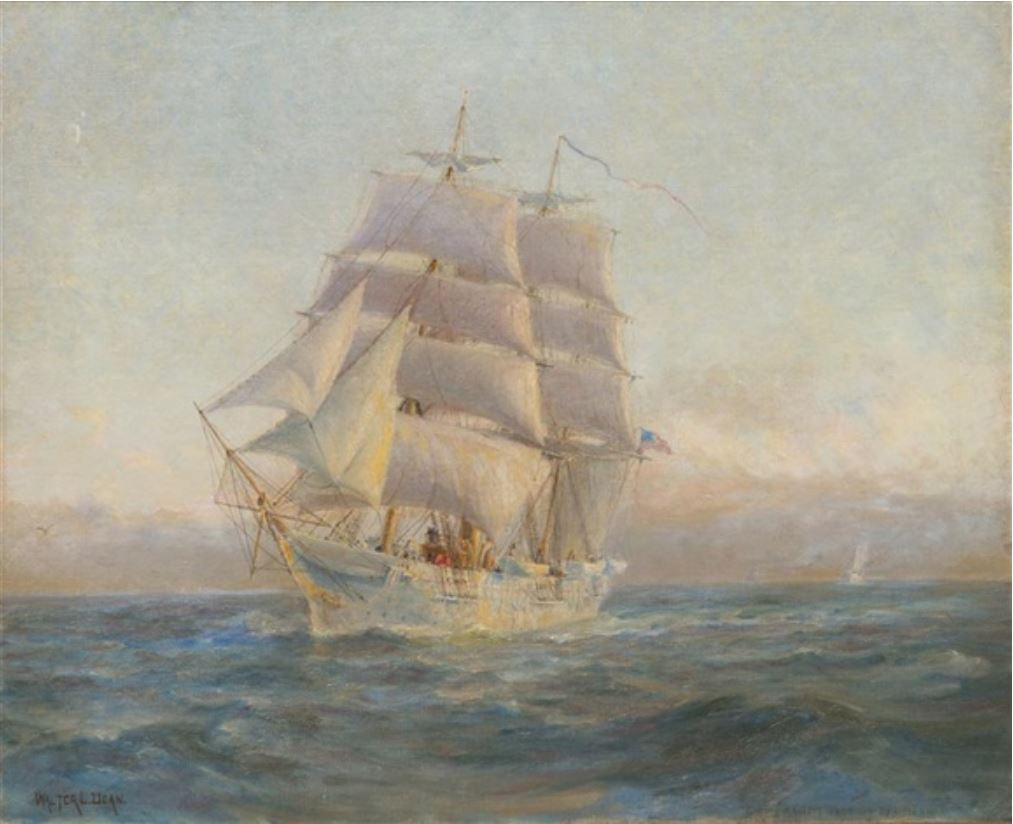
Enterprise working out of Massachusetts by Walter Lofthouse Dean

Enterprise was again commissioned 8 July 1890, and for the next year operated principally in the Caribbean. From September 1891 until September 1892, she served as training and practice ship at the United States Naval Academy, Annapolis, Maryland. On 17 October 1892 at Boston, she was lent to the Commonwealth of Massachusetts for duty as a school ship at the Massachusetts Maritime Academy. In that capacity she trained cadets for some 17 years (the current MMA training ship was named USTS Enterprise in honor of her until the name was changed to USTS Kennedy). Returned to the Navy on 4 May 1909, Enterprise was sold on 1 October 1909. The hulk was burned for salvage near Boston in 1910.

== See also ==
- List of ships of the United States Navy named Enterprise

Preceded by 1831	USS Enterprise; 1877–1909	Succeeded by SP-790
