= USS Boise (CL-47) =

Brooklyn-class light cruiser

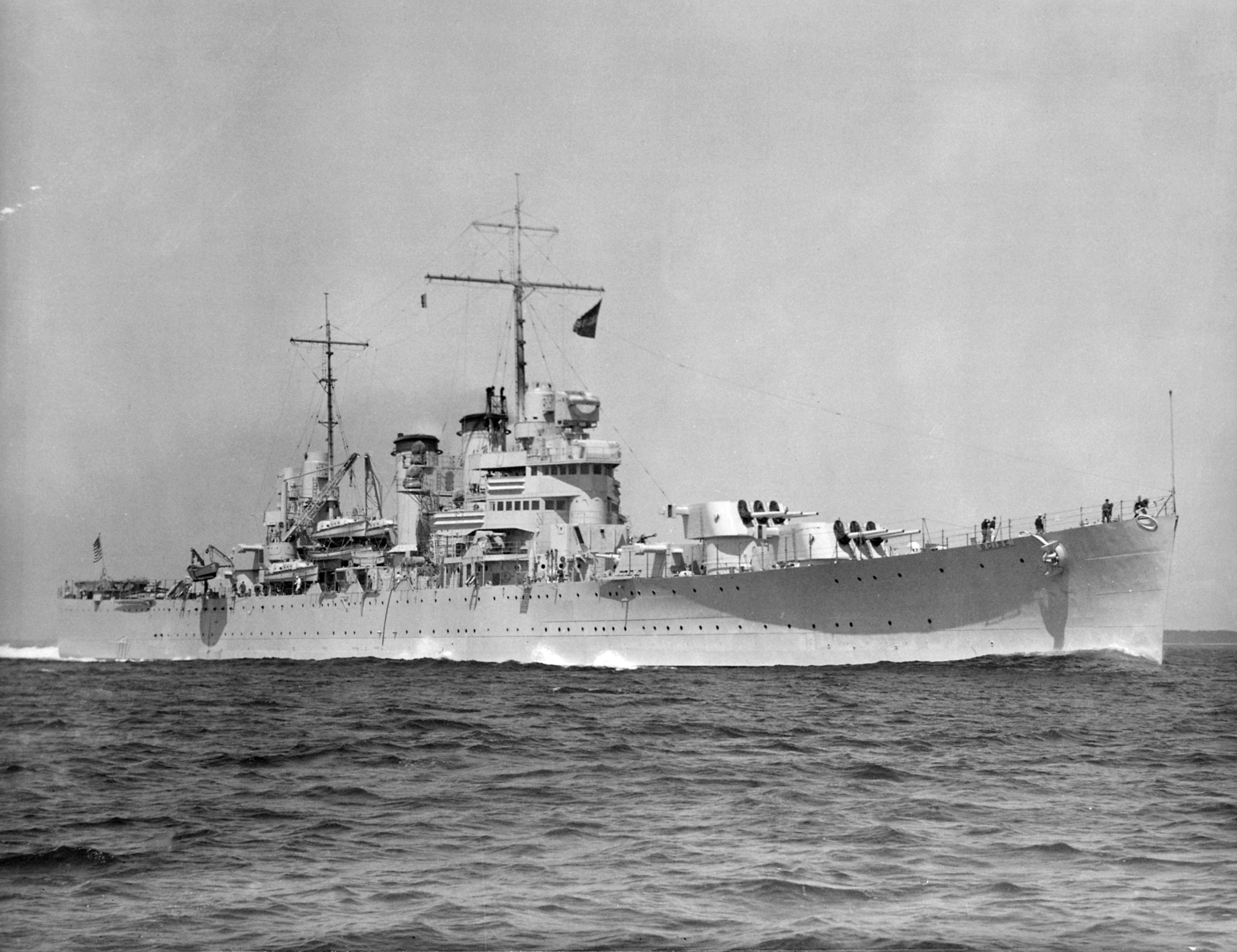
- USS Boise (July 1938)

History

United States
- Name: Boise
- Namesake: City of Boise, Idaho
- Ordered: 13 February 1929
- Awarded: 22 August 1934
- Builder: Newport News Shipbuilding and Drydock Company, Newport News, Virginia
- Cost: $11,650,000 (contract price)
- Laid down: 1 April 1935
- Launched: 3 December 1936
- Sponsored by: Miss Salome Clark
- Commissioned: 12 August 1938
- Decommissioned: 1 July 1946
- Stricken: 25 January 1951
- Identification: Hull symbol:CL-47; Code letters:NAQG
- Honors and awards: 11 × battle stars
- Fate: Sold to Argentina, 11 January 1951

Argentina
- Name: Nueve de Julio
- Namesake: Independence of Argentina
- Acquired: 11 January 1951
- Commissioned: 11 March 1952
- Decommissioned: 1979
- Identification: Hull symbol:C-5
- Fate: Sold for scrap August 1981; Scrapped 1983 at Brownsville, Texas

General characteristics (as built)
- Class & type: Brooklyn-class cruiser
- Displacement: 10,000 long tons (10,160 t) (estimated as design); 9,767 long tons (9,924 t) (standard); 12,207 long tons (12,403 t) (max)
- Length: 600 ft (180 m) lwl; 608 ft 4 in (185.42 m) oa
- Beam: 61 ft 7 in (18.77 m)
- Draft: 19 ft 9 in (6.02 m) (mean); 24 ft (7.3 m) (max)
- Installed power: 8 × Steam boilers; 100,000 shp (75,000 kW)
- Propulsion: 4 × geared turbines; 4 × screws
- Speed: 32.5 kn (37.4 mph; 60.2 km/h)
- Complement: 868 officers and enlisted
- Armament: 15 × 6 in (152 mm)/47 caliber Mark 16 guns (5x3); 8 × 5 in (127 mm)/25 caliber anti-aircraft guns (8×1); 8 × caliber 0.50 in (12.7 mm) machine guns
- Armor: Belt: 3 1/4–5 in (83–127 mm); Deck: 2 in (51 mm); Barbettes: 6 in (150 mm); Turrets: 1 1/4–6 in (32–152 mm); Conning tower: 2 1/4–5 in (57–127 mm)
- Aircraft carried: 4 × SOC Seagull floatplanes
- Aviation facilities: 2 × stern catapults

General characteristics (1945)
- Armament: 15 × 6 in (152 mm)/47 caliber Mark 16 guns (5x3); 8 × 5 in (127 mm)/25 caliber anti-aircraft guns (8×1); 4 × quad 40 mm (1.6 in) Bofors anti-aircraft guns; 2 × twin 40 mm (1.6 in) Bofors anti-aircraft guns; 18 × single 20 mm (0.79 in) Oerlikon anti-aircraft cannons

USS Boise (CL-47) was a light cruiser of the Brooklyn class in the United States Navy. The cruiser was named for Boise, the capital city of the state of Idaho. Commissioned in 1938, she saw extensive service during World War II, taking part in fighting in the Mediterranean and Pacific theaters. Following the war the ship was decommissioned in 1946 and lay idle until sold to Argentina in 1951. Renamed ARA Nueve de Julio, the ship remained in service with the Argentinian Navy until 1978, after which she was taken to Brownsville, Texas and scrapped in 1983.

== Construction and career ==
=== Commissioning and Interwar period ===
Boise was launched on 3 December 1936 by Newport News Shipbuilding and Dry Dock Company, Newport News, Virginia, sponsored by Miss Salome Clark, the daughter of Governor Clark of Idaho. The ship commissioned on 12 August 1938 with Captain Benjamin Vaughan McCandlish in command.

In February 1939, following a shakedown cruise to Monrovia, Liberia and Cape Town, Union of South Africa, Boise joined Cruiser Division 9 (CruDiv 9), Battle Force, at San Pedro, California. Until November 1941, she operated alternately off the west coast and in Hawaiian waters. She then escorted a convoy to Manila, Philippine Islands, arriving on 4 December.

=== World War II ===
The outbreak of war on 8 December 1941 found Boise off Cebu Island. On 9 January 1942 Task Force 5 (TF 5) was in northern Australian waters. Boise with the task force commander, Rear Admiral Glassford aboard, departed Darwin that day with Marblehead and destroyers Barker, Parrott, Bulmer, Stewart and Pope escorting the Dutch ship Bloemfontein that was transporting hastily re-stowed supplies, artillery and artillerymen of the Headquarters Battery, 26th Field Artillery Brigade and the 1st Battalion, 131st Field Artillery that had arrived with the Pensacola Convoy to Surabaya. She rejoined the other elements of TF 5 in the East Indies, but on 21 January 1942 she struck an “uncharted” shoal in Sape Strait and had to retire to Colombo, Ceylon; Bombay, India; and Mare Island Navy Yard for repairs, which in essence saved her from being destroyed with the rest of the Allied ships during the various battles around Java. Her repairs completed, she sailed on 22 June to escort a convoy to Auckland, New Zealand.

Boise returned to Pearl Harbor and was tasked to conduct a raiding cruise in Japanese waters in hopes of creating an impression, including generating radio traffic, of a striking force heading for Japan to draw attention away from preparations for Guadalcanal. Boise departed Pearl Harbor 27 July and was expected to begin this raid on the Japanese sampan patrol line guarding approaches to Honshu about 750 miles (1,210 km) east of Tokyo on 5 August. She completed the raid on 8 August. Two seaplanes that had to land on the water at sunset were lost, one being found by the Japanese with indications this caused apprehension of a strike force preparing to attack Japan.

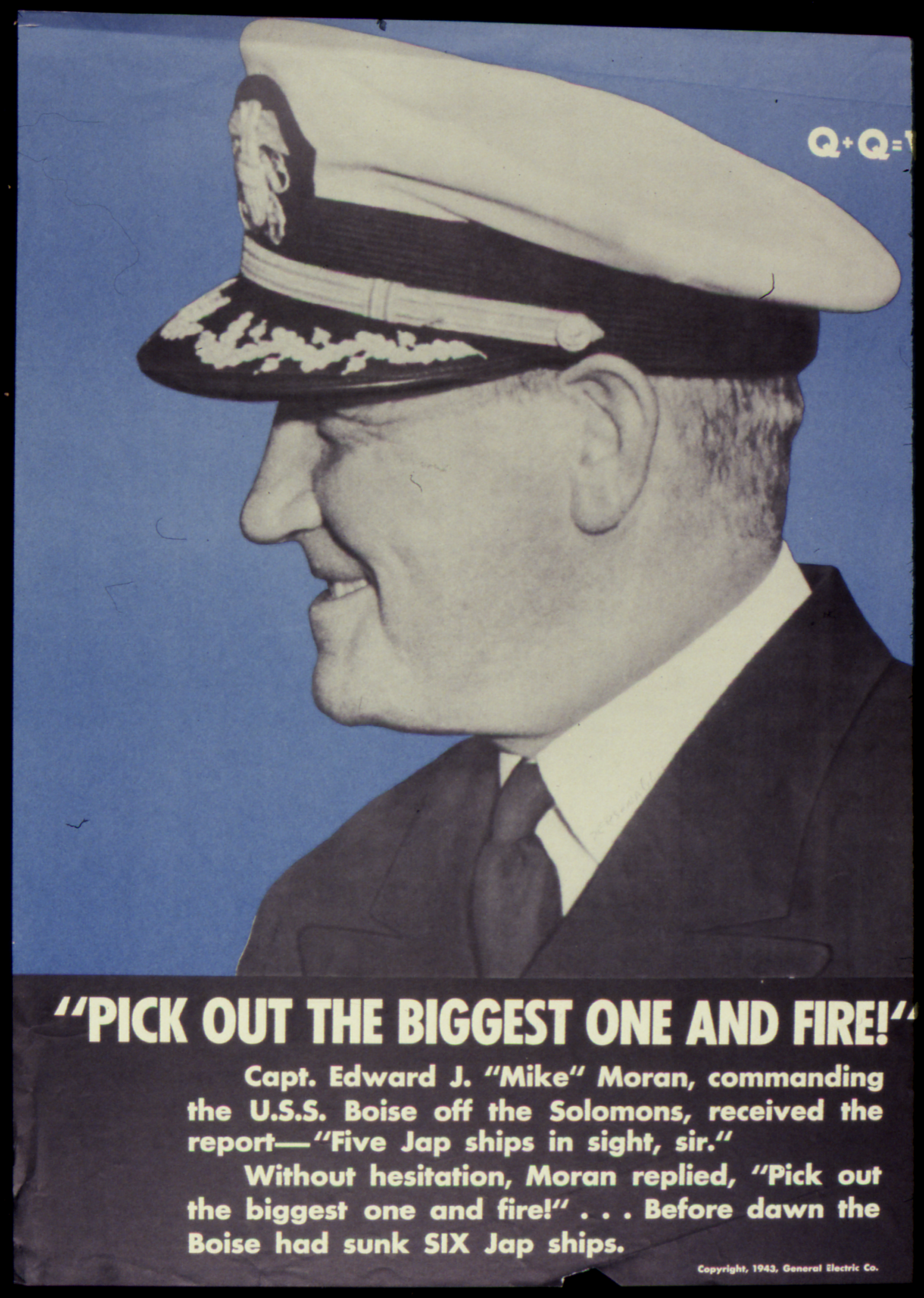
"Pick Out the Biggest One and Fire!" – wartime propaganda poster quoting a command issued by Captain Edward J. "Mike" Moran on USS Boise, during a battle near the Solomons

In August, she escorted a convoy to Fiji and New Hebrides. From 14 to 18 September, she helped cover the landing of Marine reinforcements on Guadalcanal.

On the night of 11–12 October 1942, during the Battle of Cape Esperance, the task force of which Boise was part encountered a force of Japanese cruisers and destroyers to the west of Guadalcanal. In the engagement Boise was hit a number of times, twice by fire from a Japanese heavy cruiser from about 7,500 yards (6,900 m) range. One hit exploded upon impact on her armor causing little damage. The other penetrated under the waterline and exploded in the 6 in (152 mm) magazine located between number I and II turrets causing a powder fire and flooding, putting turrets I, II, and III out of action and causing a number of casualties including 107 killed.

Under the command of Captain "Mike" Moran, who was later awarded the Navy Cross for his leadership during the battle, Boise made her way to Philadelphia Navy Yard, where she underwent repairs from 19 November 1942 to 20 March 1943. The gunfire damage was the first case available for complete Bureau of Ships analysis. It was discovered that one of the shells was of English manufacture.

Boise departed on 8 June for the Mediterranean, arriving at Algiers, Algeria on 21 June. From 10 July to 18 August, she acted as a cover and fire support ship for the Amphibious Battle of Gela during the Invasion of Sicily. In September, she took part in the Italian mainland landings at Taranto (9–10 September) and Salerno (12–19 September). She returned to New York on 15 November, and once again steamed to the South Pacific, arriving at Milne Bay, New Guinea on 31 December.

During January–September 1944, she took part in operations along the northern shore of New Guinea, including: Madang-Alexishafen bombardment (25–26 January); Humboldt Bay landings (22 April); shelling the Wakde and Sawar Airfields to neutralize the danger of air attack on newly won Allied positions (29–30 April); Battle of Wakde-Toem landings (15–25 May); Battle of Biak landings (25 May – 10 June); Battle of Noemfoor landings (1–2 July); Battle of Sansapor landings (27 July – 31 August); and the Battle of Morotai landings (1–30 September). The cruiser then moved north, as the battle front advanced into the Philippines, taking part in: Leyte invasion (20–24 October); Battle of Surigao Strait (25 October); Mindoro landings (12–17 December); Leyte-Mindoro covering action (26–29 December); Lingayen Gulf landings, with General Douglas MacArthur embarked (4–13 January 1945); Luzon covering force (14–31 January); Bataan-Corregidor occupation (13–17 February); and Zamboanga landings (8–12 March). She then moved to Borneo for the Tarakan landings (27 April – 3 May).

From 3–16 June, she carried General MacArthur on a 3,500 miles (5,600 km) tour of the Central and Southern Philippines and Brunei Bay, Borneo, and then returned to San Pedro, California, arriving on 7 July. There she remained, undergoing overhaul and training until October. She sailed on 3 October for the east coast, arriving at New York on 20 October. Boise remained there until decommissioned on 1 July 1946.

=== Argentine Navy ===
Boise was sold to Argentina on 11 January 1951, along with Phoenix, where they were commissioned as Nueve de Julio ("9 July", Argentina's Independence Day) and Diecisiete de Octubre (later renamed General Belgrano) respectively.

During her years as an Argentinian warship, she took part of the Revolución Libertadora, shelling oil depots and military facilities around the coastal city of Mar del Plata, on 19 September 1955. She was accidentally rammed by General Belgrano on exercises in 1956, which resulted in damage to both cruisers.

Nueve de Julio remained in service with the Argentine Navy until 1978, when she was decommissioned and towed to Brownsville, Texas.

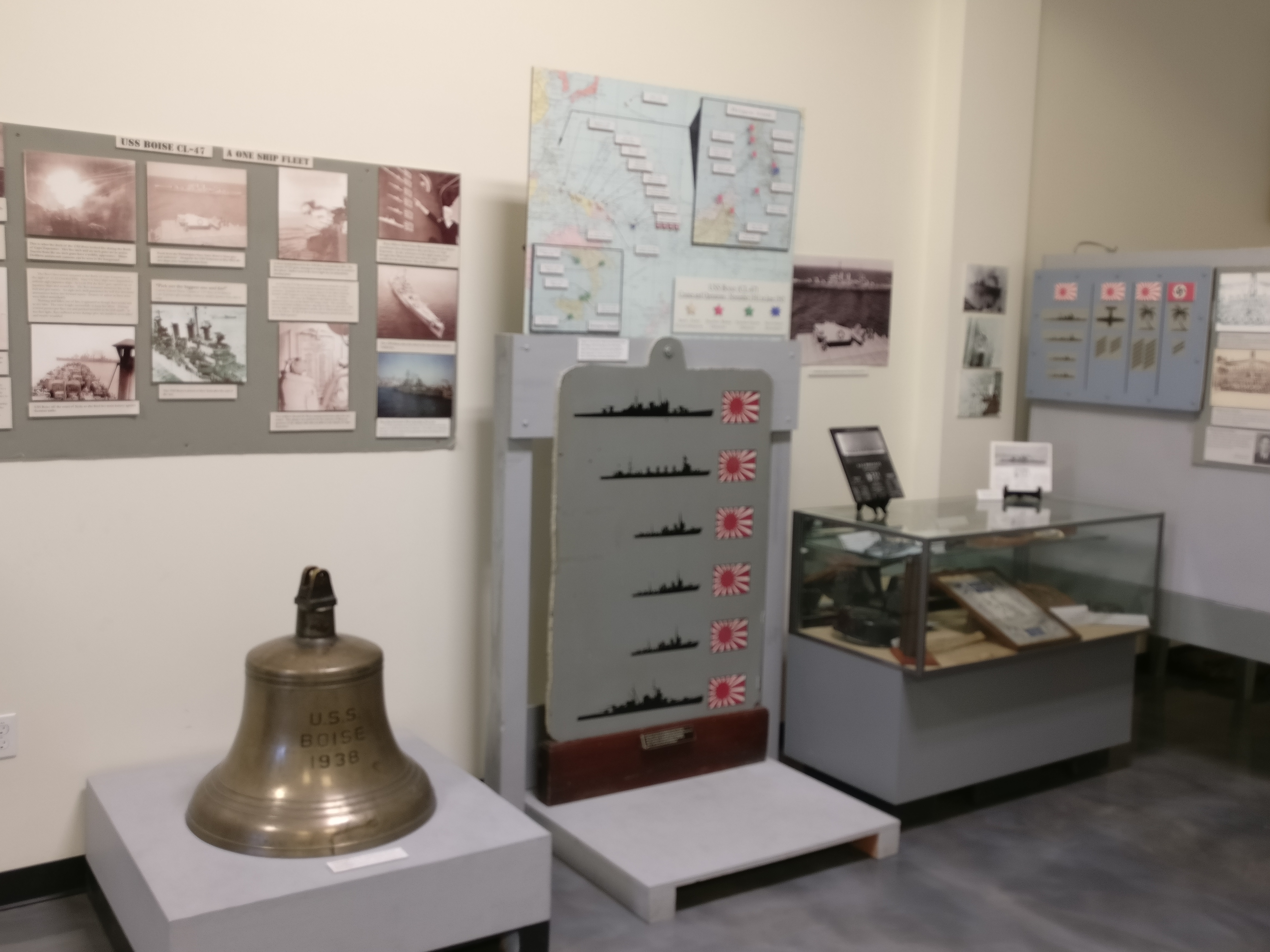
The ship's bell, which was saved whilst she was being scrapped, is on display at the Idaho Military History Museum

== Awards ==
Boise received 11 battle stars for her service in World War II.
