= Idaho Military History Museum =

Military museum in the US

Coordinates: 43°33′28″N 116°14′23″W

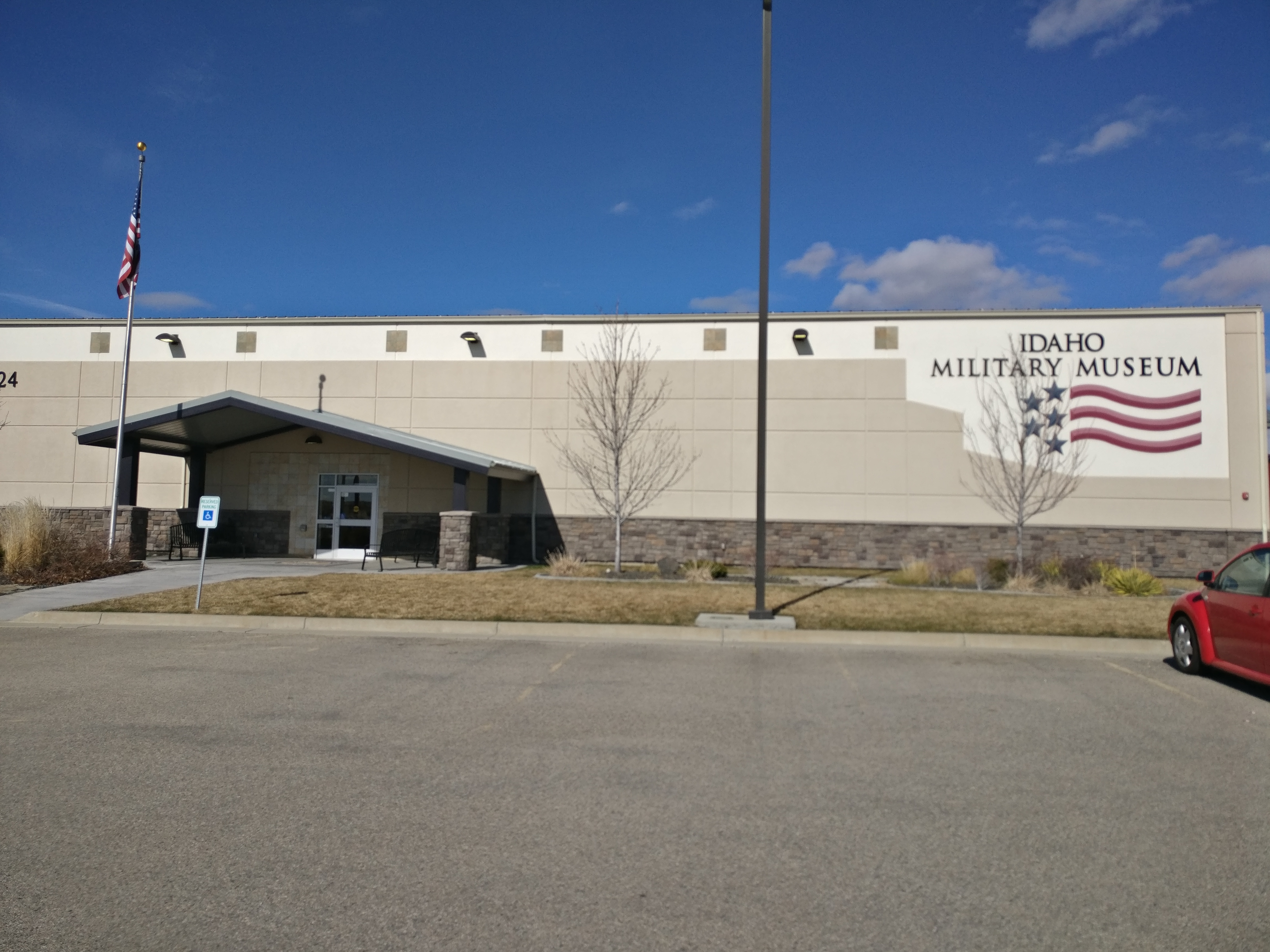
The renovated museum in February 2018

The Idaho Military History Museum, located at Gowen Field near Boise, Idaho, features exhibits relating to every branch of the service and each war in which Idahoans have served from the Spanish–American War onwards; the Farragut Naval Training Station (now Farragut State Park, Idaho's largest), Gowen Field itself, the Medal of Honor exhibit, and the well-traveled USS Boise (CL-47) exhibit.

== Photo gallery ==
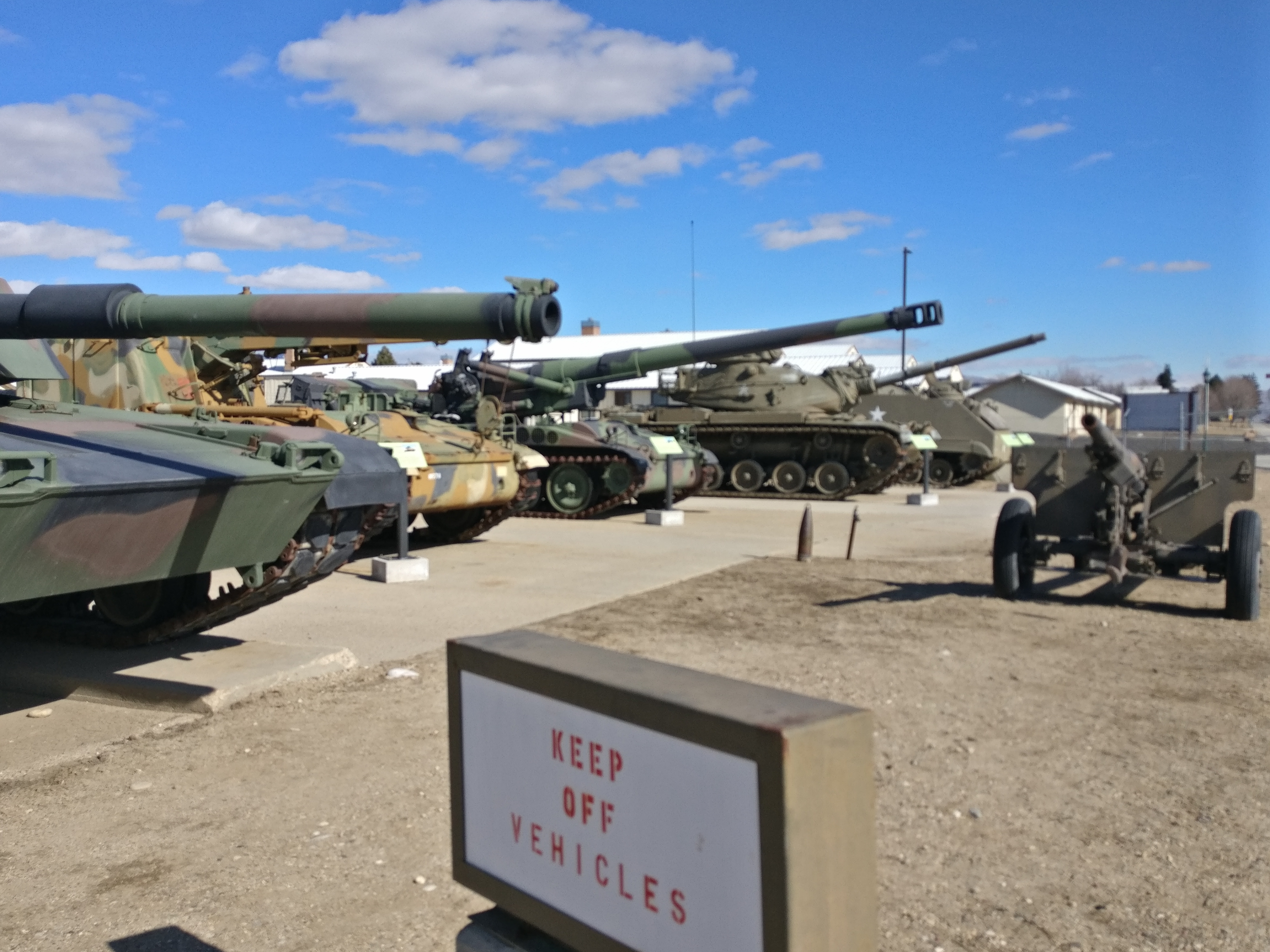
A static display of an A1IP Abrams Main Battle Tank, M578 Light Recovery Vehicle, M110 Self-Propelled Howitzer, etc.

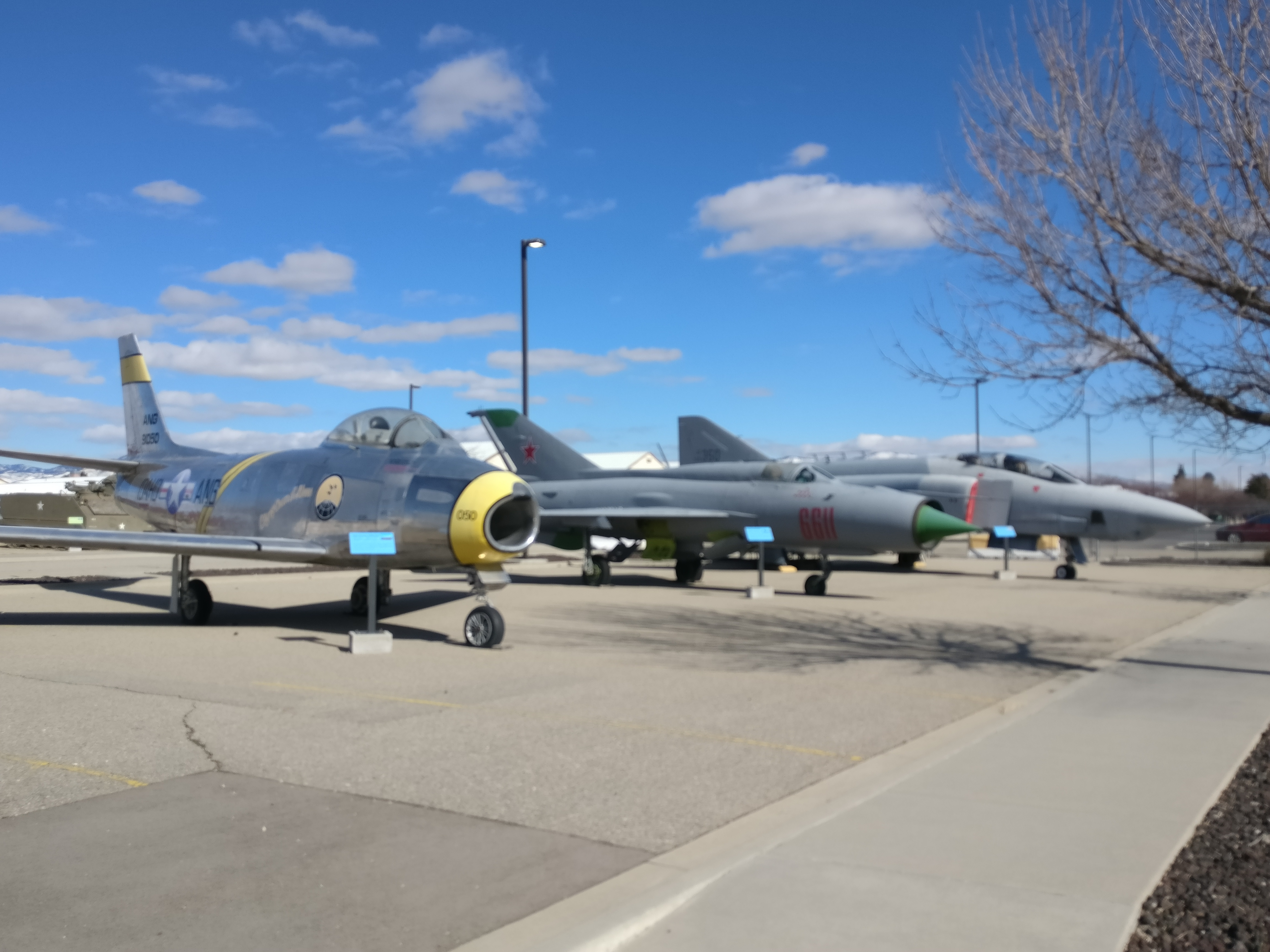
A static display of a North American F-86A Sabre (replica), a MiG-21 (originally Polish, but in Soviet livery here), and a McDonnell-Douglas RF-4C Phantom.

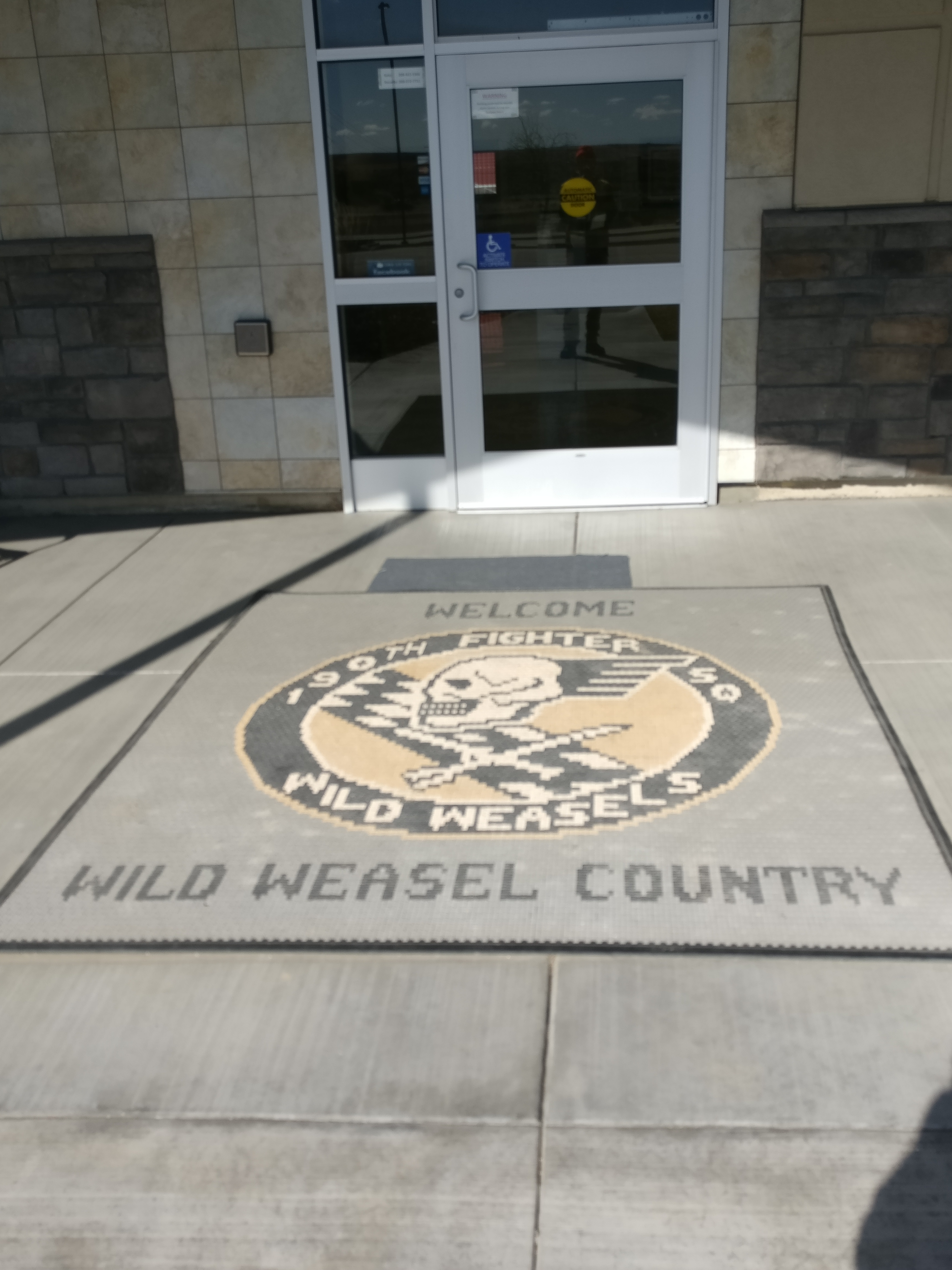
Wild Weasel welcome mat, courtesy of the 190th Fighter Squadron, Idaho Air National Guard 124th Fighter Wing, located at Gowen Field Air National Guard Base.

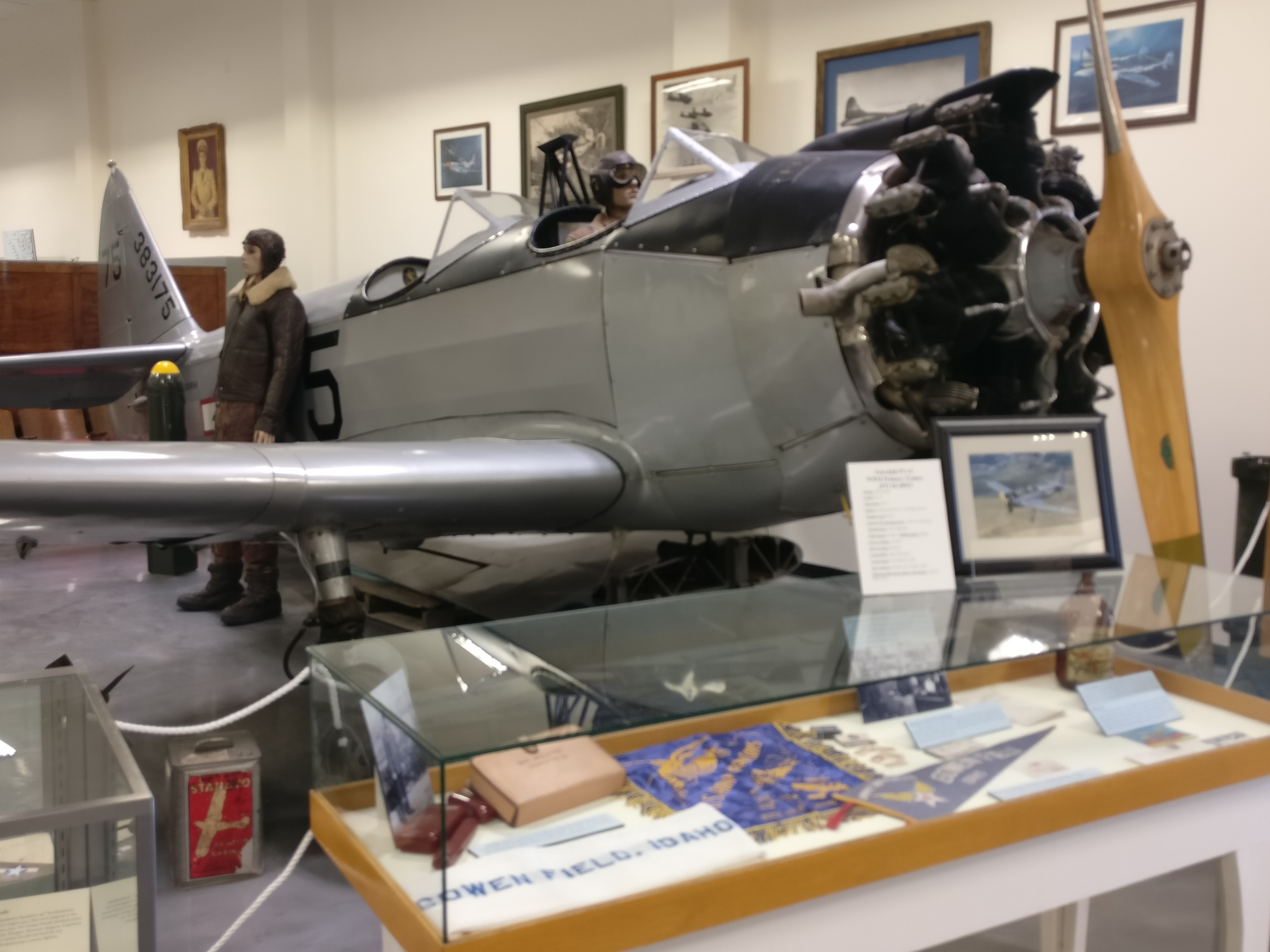
The Fairchild PT-23 trainer near the entrance is the largest object in the Gowen Field exhibit and indeed in the museum itself.

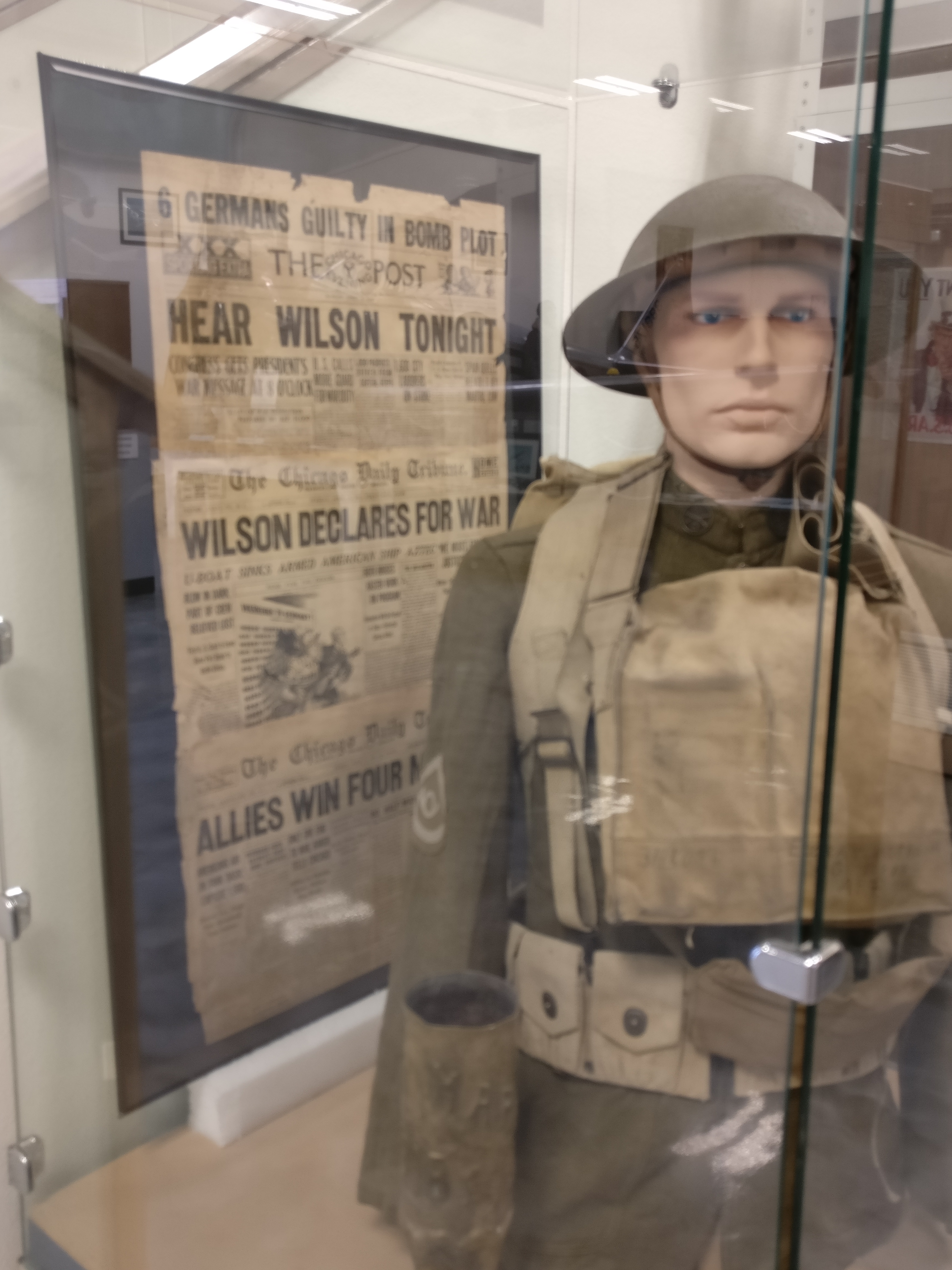
WWI exhibit; The Chicago Evening Post and The Chicago Tribune announce America's entry into the war here.

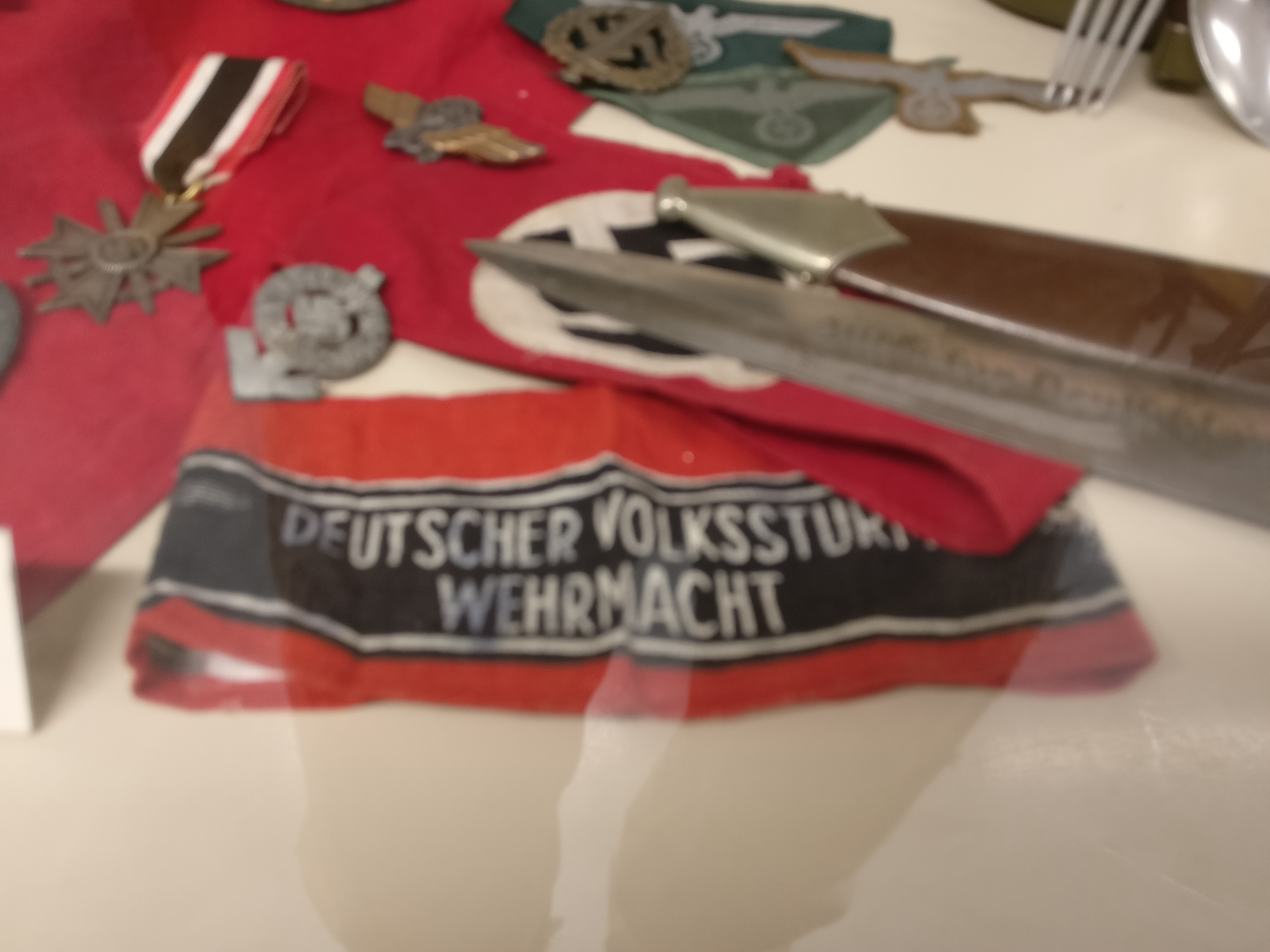
Nazi and Wehrmacht regalia, including a Volkssturm armband.

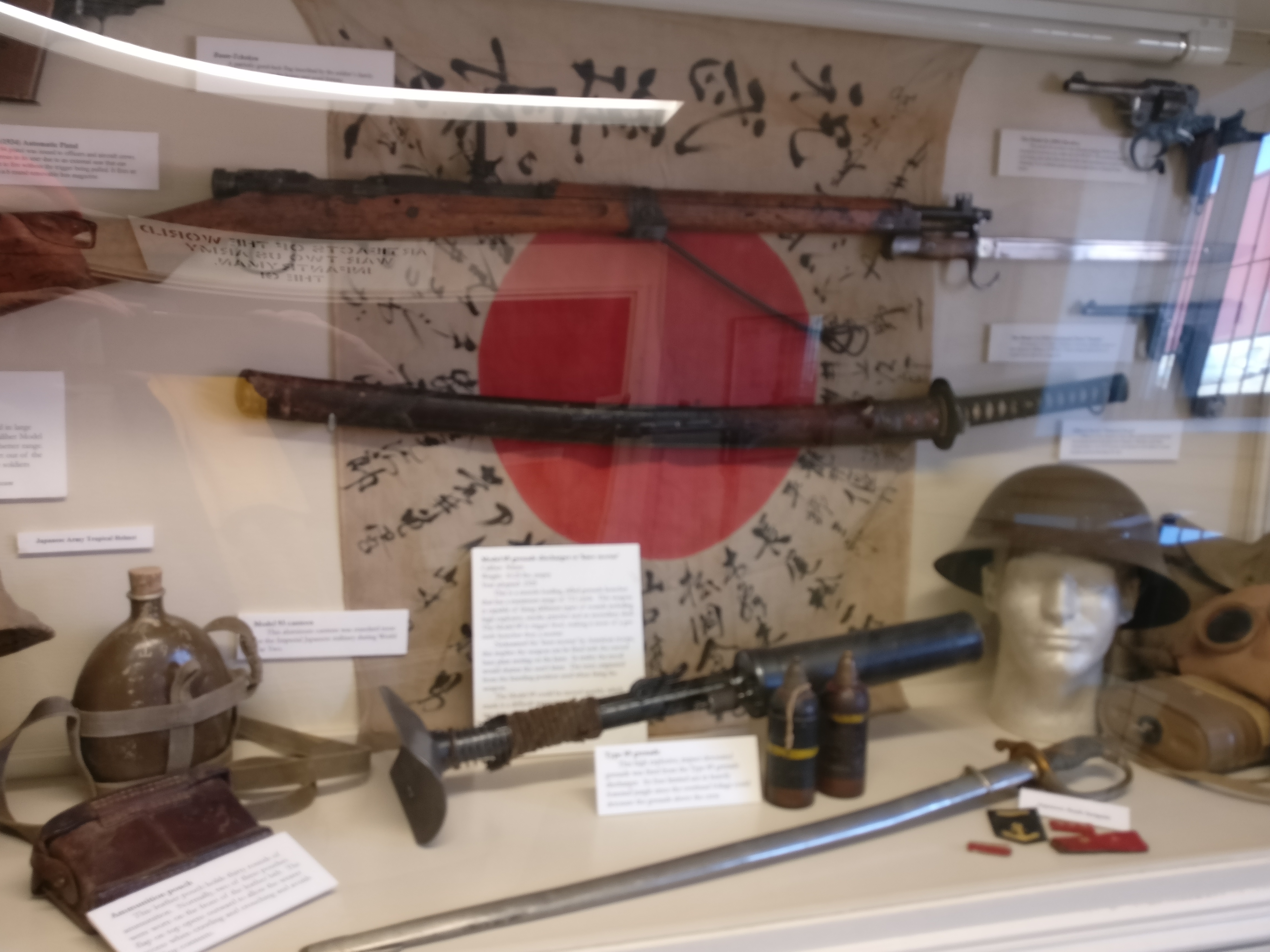
Japanese Imperial Army regalia, including a Buun-Tchokyu.

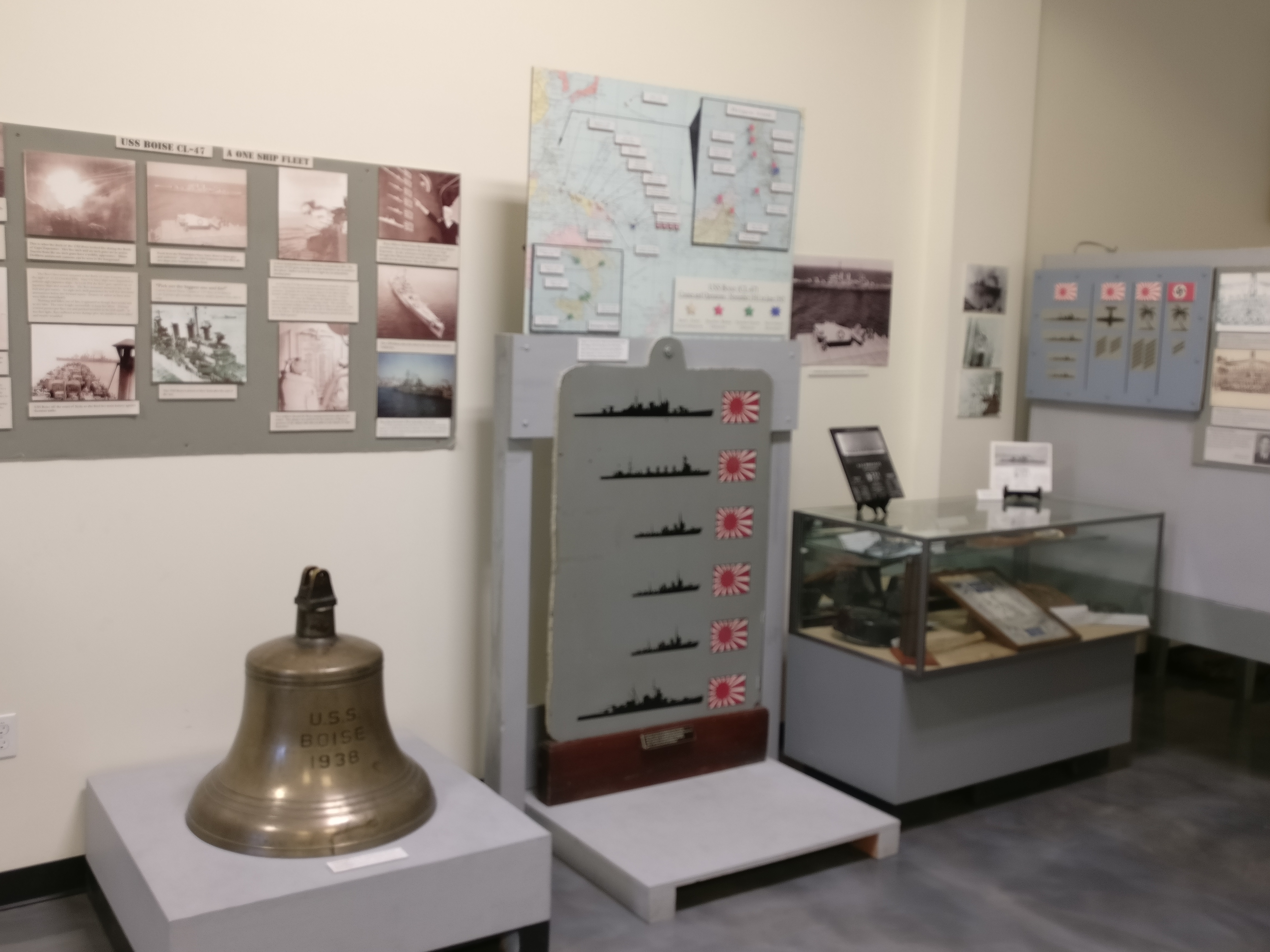
USS Boise (CL-47) exhibit, most notably featuring the ship's bell which was saved whilst she was being scrapped.

== See also ==
- List of aviation museums
