= German submarine U-459 =

German World War II submarine

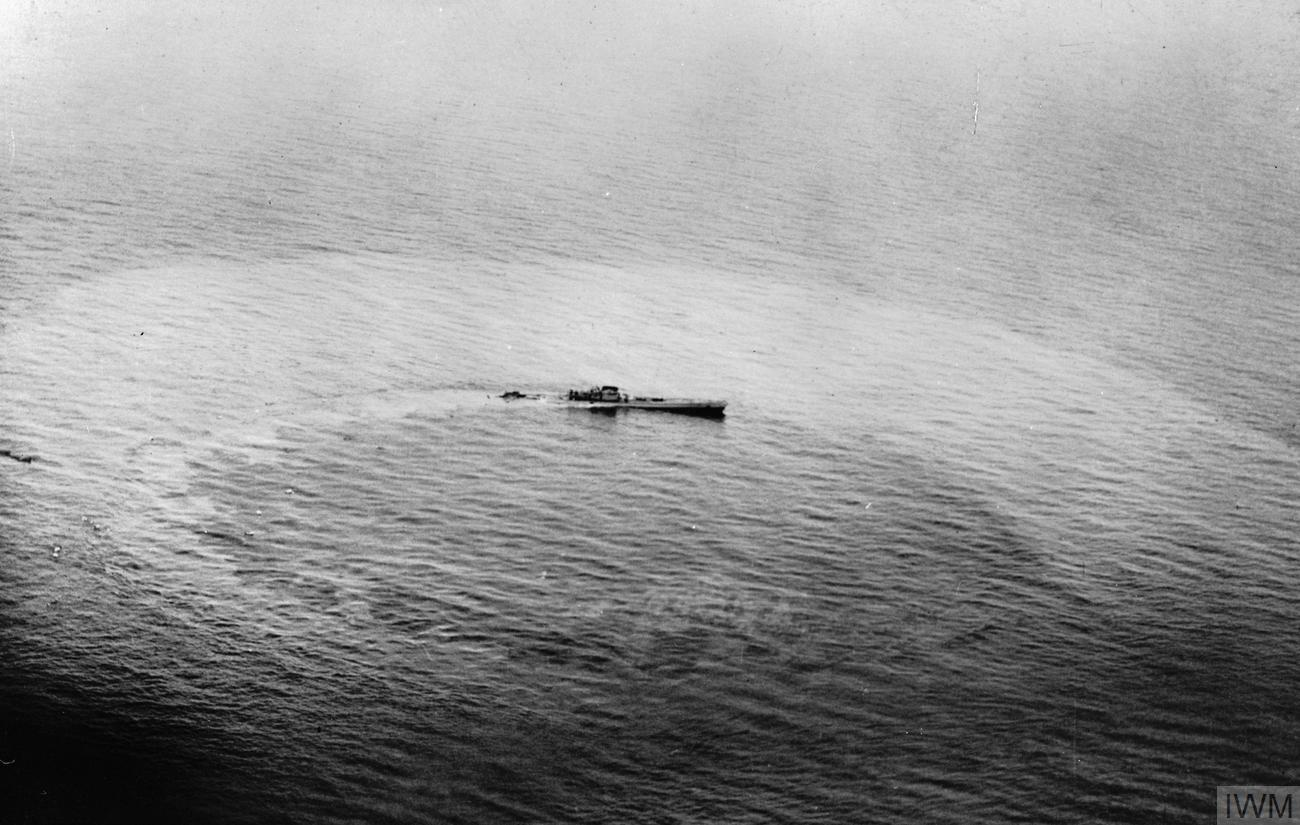
- U-459 sinking after being attacked by Vickers Wellington aircraft

History

Nazi Germany
- Name: U-459
- Ordered: 14 May 1940
- Builder: Deutsche Werke, Kiel
- Yard number: 290
- Laid down: 22 November 1940
- Launched: 13 September 1941
- Commissioned: 15 November 1941
- Fate: Scuttled on 24 July 1943

General characteristics
- Class & type: Type XIV ocean-going submarine tanker
- Displacement: 1,688 t (1,661 long tons) surfaced; 1,932 t (1,901 long tons) submerged
- Length: 67.10 m (220 ft 2 in) o/a; 48.51 m (159 ft 2 in) pressure hull
- Beam: 9.35 m (30 ft 8 in) o/a; 4.90 m (16 ft 1 in) pressure hull
- Height: 11.70 m (38 ft 5 in)
- Draught: 6.51 m (21 ft 4 in)
- Installed power: 2,800–3,200 PS (2,100–2,400 kW; 2,800–3,200 bhp) (diesels); 750 PS (550 kW; 740 shp) (electric)
- Propulsion: 2 shafts; 2 × diesel engines; 2 × electric motors
- Speed: 14.4–14.9 knots (26.7–27.6 km/h; 16.6–17.1 mph) surfaced; 6.2 knots (11.5 km/h; 7.1 mph) submerged
- Range: 12,350 nmi (22,870 km; 14,210 mi) at 10 knots (19 km/h; 12 mph) surfaced; 55 nmi (102 km; 63 mi) at 4 knots (7.4 km/h; 4.6 mph) submerged
- Test depth: 240 m (790 ft)
- Complement: 6 officers and 47 enlisted
- Armament: 2 × 3.7 cm (1.5 in) SK C/30 anti-aircraft guns; 1 × 2 cm (0.79 in) C/30 AA gun

Service record
- Part of: 4th U-boat Flotilla; 15 November 1941 – 31 March 1942; 10th U-boat Flotilla; 1 April – 31 October 1942; 12th U-boat Flotilla; 1 November 1942 – 24 July 1943
- Identification codes: M 42 590
- Commanders: K.Kapt. Georg von Wilamowitz-Moellendorf; 15 November 1941 – 24 July 1943
- Operations: 6 patrols: 1st patrol: 29 March – 15 May 1942; 2nd patrol: 6 June – 19 July 1942; 3rd patrol: 18 August – 4 November 1942; 4th patrol: 20 December 1942 – 7 March 1943; 5th patrol: 20 April – 3 June 1943; 6th patrol: 22 – 24 July 1943
- Victories: None

German submarine U-459 was a Type XIV supply and replenishment U-boat (Milchkuh or 'milk cow') of Nazi Germany's Kriegsmarine during World War II.

Her keel was laid down on 22 November 1940 by Deutsche Werke in Kiel as yard number 290. The submarine was launched on 13 September 1941 and commissioned on 15 November, with Kapitänleutnant Georg von Wilamowitz-Moellendorff in command; he remained in charge until the boat was lost, receiving promotion to Korvettenkapitän in the process.

== Design ==
German Type XIV submarines were shortened versions of the Type IXDs they were based on. U-459 had a displacement of 1,688 tonnes (1,661 long tons) when at the surface and 1,932 tonnes (1,901 long tons) while submerged. The U-boat had a total length of 67.10 m (220 ft 2 in), a pressure hull length of 48.51 m (159 ft 2 in), a beam of 9.35 m (30 ft 8 in), a height of 11.70 m (38 ft 5 in), and a draught of 6.51 m (21 ft 4 in). The submarine was powered by two Germaniawerft supercharged four-stroke, six-cylinder diesel engines producing a total of 2,800–3,200 metric horsepower (2,060–2,350 kW; 2,760–3,160 shp) for use while surfaced, two Siemens-Schuckert 2 GU 345/38-8 double-acting electric motors producing a total of 750 metric horsepower (550 kW; 740 shp) for use while submerged. She had two shafts and two propellers. The boat was capable of operating at depths of up to 240 metres (790 ft).

The submarine had a maximum surface speed of 14.4–14.9 knots (26.7–27.6 km/h; 16.6–17.1 mph) and a maximum submerged speed of 6.2 knots (11.5 km/h; 7.1 mph). When submerged, the boat could operate for 120 nautical miles (220 km; 140 mi) at 2 knots (3.7 km/h; 2.3 mph); when surfaced, she could travel 12,350 nautical miles (22,870 km; 14,210 mi) at 10 knots (19 km/h; 12 mph). U-459 was not fitted with torpedo tubes or deck guns, but had two 3.7 cm (1.5 in) SK C/30 anti-aircraft guns with 2500 rounds as well as a 2 cm (0.79 in) C/30 guns with 3000 rounds. The boat had a complement of fifty-three.

== Operational career ==
U-459 conducted six patrols, but as a supply boat, she avoided combat. The submarine initially served in the 4th U-boat Flotilla, for training, before moving on to the 10th (in April 1942) and the 12th flotillas (in November of the same year), for operations.

=== First and second patrols ===
Having moved from Kiel to Helgoland U-459 set-off for occupied France, arriving in St. Nazaire on 15 May 1942, after traversing the north-central Atlantic. Her captain, von Wilamowitz-Moellendorf, was 48, one of the oldest skippers at the time. In April 1942 she arrived in a position approximately 500 miles north-east of Bermuda where she refuelled eleven U-Boats operating in the Caribbean and off the east coast of the USA, significantly extending their time on patrol and effect against allied shipping.

Her second patrol began on 6 June 1942. It was at about this time that von Wilamowitz-Moellendorf was promoted to Korvettenkapitän.

=== Third and fourth patrols ===
Her third foray saw the boat sail into the south Atlantic, as far as Namibia. She departed St. Nazaire on 18 August 1942 and returned on 4 November.

Her fourth patrol was her longest, from 20 December 1942 to 7 March 1943, a total of 78 days. She started in St. Nazaire and finished in Bordeaux. This voyage included sailing toward Cameroon, the boat's nearest position to that country was reached on 18 January 1943. On 4 September 1942 U-459 shared rations with the survivors in a lifeboat from the sunken freighter SS California which had been torpedoed by Italian sub Reginaldo Giuliani 13 August 1942

=== Fifth and sixth patrols and loss ===
Her fifth patrol began when she left Bordeaux on 20 April 1943. On 30 May, she shot down a British Whitley aircraft of (10 OTU RAF) (Crew rescued). She was also attacked, on the same day, by an RAF Liberator with a total of ten depth charges. U-459 was not damaged but her AA guns caused slight damage to the attacking Liberator. She returned to her French base on 30 May.

After departing Bordeaux on 22 July 1943, U-459 was attacked on 24 July near Cape Ortegal, Spain, by two British Wellington aircraft of No. 172 Squadron RAF. The boat shot down one of the Wellingtons (5 Killed In Action, 1 survived) but 18 submarine crewmen were killed during the action. U-459 was crippled when a Wellington of No. 547 Squadron RAF, damaged by flak, crashed into the starboard side of the boat. The damage was so severe that she had to be scuttled. The rear gunner of the Wellington, Sergeant A. A. Turner, was the only survivor of the aircraft. Norman Franks wrote that Commander von Wilamowitz-Moellendorff was seen on the bridge, saluting his crew before disappearing into the conning tower hatch to complete the scuttling. He seemingly made no attempt to escape, going down with his command. The 41 survivors of the crew were taken prisoner.

=== Wolfpacks ===
U-459 took part in one wolfpack, namely:

- Wolfpack Eisbär (25 August – 1 September 1942)

== Bibliography ==
- Franks, Norman L. R. (1997). Dark Sky, Deep Water. London: Grub Street. ISBN 978-1-89-869757-2.
- Gröner, Erich; Jung, Dieter; Maass, Martin (1991). U-boats and Mine Warfare Vessels. German Warships 1815–1945. Vol. 2. Translated by Thomas, Keith; Magowan, Rachel. London: Conway Maritime Press. ISBN 0-85177-593-4.
- Kemp, Paul (1999). U-Boats Destroyed – German Submarine Losses in the World Wars. London: Arms & Armour. ISBN 1-85409-515-3.
