= German submarine U-489 =

German World War II submarine

Coordinates: 61°11′N 14°38′W

History

Nazi Germany
- Name: U-489
- Ordered: 17 July 1941
- Builder: Germaniawerft, Kiel
- Yard number: 558
- Laid down: 28 January 1942
- Launched: 24 December 1942
- Commissioned: 8 March 1943
- Fate: Sunk on 4 August 1943

General characteristics
- Class & type: Type XIV ocean-going submarine tanker
- Displacement: 1,688 t (1,661 long tons) surfaced; 1,932 t (1,901 long tons) submerged
- Length: 67.10 m (220 ft 2 in) o/a; 48.51 m (159 ft 2 in) pressure hull
- Beam: 9.35 m (30 ft 8 in) o/a; 4.90 m (16 ft 1 in) pressure hull
- Height: 11.70 m (38 ft 5 in)
- Draught: 6.51 m (21 ft 4 in)
- Installed power: 2,800–3,200 PS (2,100–2,400 kW; 2,800–3,200 bhp) (diesels); 750 PS (550 kW; 740 shp) (electric)
- Propulsion: 2 shafts; 2 × diesel engines; 2 × electric motors
- Speed: 14.4–14.9 knots (26.7–27.6 km/h; 16.6–17.1 mph) surfaced; 6.2 knots (11.5 km/h; 7.1 mph) submerged
- Range: 12,350 nmi (22,870 km; 14,210 mi) at 10 knots (19 km/h; 12 mph) surfaced; 55 nmi (102 km; 63 mi) at 4 knots (7.4 km/h; 4.6 mph) submerged
- Test depth: 240 m (790 ft)
- Complement: 6 officers and 47 enlisted
- Armament: 2 × 3.7 cm (1.5 in) SK C/30 anti-aircraft guns; 1 × 2 cm (0.79 in) C/30 AA gun

Service record
- Part of: 4th U-boat Flotilla; 8 March – 31 July 1943; 12th U-boat Flotilla; 1 – 4 August 1943
- Identification codes: M 50 390
- Commanders: Oblt.z.S. Adalbert Schmandt; 8 March – 4 August 1943
- Operations: 1st patrol: 22 July – 4 August 1943
- Victories: None

German submarine U-489 was a Type XIV supply and replenishment U-boat ("Milchkuh") of Nazi Germany's Kriegsmarine during World War II.

Her keel was laid down on 28 January 1942, by Germaniawerft of Kiel as yard number 558. She was launched on 24 December 1942 and commissioned on 8 March 1943, with Leutnant zur See Adalbert Schmandt in command. He remained in command throughout the boat's short career.

The U-boat's service life commenced with the 4th U-boat Flotilla from 8 March until 31 July 1943 for training. She then served, for operations, with the 12th flotilla.

== Design ==
German Type XIV submarines were shortened versions of the Type IXDs they were based on. U-489 had a displacement of 1,688 tonnes (1,661 long tons) when at the surface and 1,932 tonnes (1,901 long tons) while submerged. The U-boat had a total length of 67.10 m (220 ft 2 in), a pressure hull length of 48.51 m (159 ft 2 in), a beam of 9.35 m (30 ft 8 in), a height of 11.70 m (38 ft 5 in), and a draught of 6.51 m (21 ft 4 in). The submarine was powered by two Germaniawerft supercharged four-stroke, six-cylinder diesel engines producing a total of 2,800–3,200 metric horsepower (2,060–2,350 kW; 2,760–3,160 shp) for use while surfaced, two Siemens-Schuckert 2 GU 345/38-8 double-acting electric motors producing a total of 750 metric horsepower (550 kW; 740 shp) for use while submerged. She had two shafts and two propellers. The boat was capable of operating at depths of up to 240 metres (790 ft).

The submarine had a maximum surface speed of 14.4–14.9 knots (26.7–27.6 km/h; 16.6–17.1 mph) and a maximum submerged speed of 6.2 knots (11.5 km/h; 7.1 mph). When submerged, the boat could operate for 120 nautical miles (220 km; 140 mi) at 2 knots (3.7 km/h; 2.3 mph); when surfaced, she could travel 12,350 nautical miles (22,870 km; 14,210 mi) at 10 knots (19 km/h; 12 mph). U-489 was not fitted with torpedo tubes or deck guns, but had two 3.7 cm (1.5 in) SK C/30 anti-aircraft guns with 2500 rounds as well as a 2 cm (0.79 in) C/30 guns with 3000 rounds. The boat had a complement of fifty-three.

== Operational career ==
U-489's only patrol began with her departure from Kiel on 22 July 1943. She headed for the Atlantic by way of the so-called Faeroes Gap between Iceland and the Faroe Islands, north of the British Isles.

She was attacked by a PBY Catalina flying boat of No. 190 Squadron RAF on 3 August. During the action, the 'Cat' was hit twice and retired. Her crew were obliged to jettison depth charges and on their return, found the rudder cables almost severed. Her place was taken by a Lockheed Hudson of 269 Squadron, which succeeded in damaging U-489.

Although as a supply boat, she avoided combat, she was lost on her first patrol when on 4 August, she was attacked by a Canadian Sunderland flying boat of No. 423 Squadron RCAF, south-east of Iceland. The Sunderland was shot down, five of the eleven man crew were killed; U-489 was sunk. 53 of her crew escaped. All the survivors were picked up by the destroyers HMS Castleton and HMS Orwell; they had both observed the attack.

== Bibliography ==
- Busch, Rainer; Röll, Hans-Joachim (1999). German U-boat commanders of World War II : a biographical dictionary. Translated by Brooks, Geoffrey. London, Annapolis, Md: Greenhill Books, Naval Institute Press. ISBN 1-55750-186-6.
- Busch, Rainer; Röll, Hans-Joachim (1999). Deutsche U-Boot-Verluste von September 1939 bis Mai 1945 [German U-boat losses from September 1939 to May 1945]. Der U-Boot-Krieg (in German). Vol. IV. Hamburg, Berlin, Bonn: Mittler. ISBN 3-8132-0514-2.
- Gröner, Erich; Jung, Dieter; Maass, Martin (1991). U-boats and Mine Warfare Vessels. German Warships 1815–1945. Vol. 2. Translated by Thomas, Keith; Magowan, Rachel. London: Conway Maritime Press. ISBN 0-85177-593-4.
- Kemp, Paul (1999). U-Boats Destroyed – German Submarine Losses in the World Wars. London: Arms & Armour. ISBN 1-85409-515-3.
