= German submarine U-464 =

German World War II submarine

Coordinates: 61°25′N 14°40′W

History

Nazi Germany
- Name: U-464
- Ordered: 15 August 1940
- Builder: Deutsche Werke, Kiel
- Yard number: 295
- Laid down: 18 March 1941
- Launched: 20 December 1941
- Commissioned: 30 April 1942
- Fate: Sunk on 20 August 1942

General characteristics
- Class & type: Type XIV ocean-going submarine tanker
- Displacement: 1,688 t (1,661 long tons) surfaced; 1,932 t (1,901 long tons) submerged
- Length: 67.10 m (220 ft 2 in) o/a; 48.51 m (159 ft 2 in) pressure hull
- Beam: 9.35 m (30 ft 8 in) o/a; 4.90 m (16 ft 1 in) pressure hull
- Height: 11.70 m (38 ft 5 in)
- Draught: 6.51 m (21 ft 4 in)
- Installed power: 2,800–3,200 PS (2,100–2,400 kW; 2,800–3,200 bhp) (diesels); 750 PS (550 kW; 740 shp) (electric)
- Propulsion: 2 shafts; 2 × diesel engines; 2 × electric motors
- Speed: 14.4–14.9 knots (26.7–27.6 km/h; 16.6–17.1 mph) surfaced; 6.2 knots (11.5 km/h; 7.1 mph) submerged
- Range: 12,350 nmi (22,870 km; 14,210 mi) at 10 knots (19 km/h; 12 mph) surfaced; 55 nmi (102 km; 63 mi) at 4 knots (7.4 km/h; 4.6 mph) submerged
- Test depth: 240 m (790 ft)
- Complement: 6 officers and 47 enlisted
- Armament: 2 × 3.7 cm (1.5 in) SK C/30 anti-aircraft guns; 1 × 2 cm (0.79 in) C/30 AA gun

Service record
- Part of: 4th U-boat Flotilla; 30 April – 1 August 1942; 10th U-boat Flotilla; 1 – 20 August 1942
- Identification codes: M 46 289
- Commanders: Kptlt. Otto Harms; 30 April – 20 August 1942
- Operations: 1 patrol: 14 – 20 August 1942
- Victories: None

German submarine U-464 was a Type XIV supply and replenishment U-boat ("Milchkuh") of Nazi Germany's Kriegsmarine during World War II.

Her keel was laid down on 18 March 1941, by Deutsche Werke in Kiel as yard number 295. She was launched on 20 December 1941 and commissioned on 30 April 1942 with Kapitänleutnant Otto Harms in command. He remained in charge for her entire career.

The boat began her service life training in the 4th U-boat Flotilla before moving on to the 10th flotilla for operations.

== Design ==
German Type XIV submarines were shortened versions of the Type IXDs they were based on. U-464 had a displacement of 1,688 tonnes (1,661 long tons) when at the surface and 1,932 tonnes (1,901 long tons) while submerged. The U-boat had a total length of 67.10 m (220 ft 2 in), a pressure hull length of 48.51 m (159 ft 2 in), a beam of 9.35 m (30 ft 8 in), a height of 11.70 m (38 ft 5 in), and a draught of 6.51 m (21 ft 4 in). The submarine was powered by two Germaniawerft supercharged four-stroke, six-cylinder diesel engines producing a total of 2,800–3,200 metric horsepower (2,060–2,350 kW; 2,760–3,160 shp) for use while surfaced, two Siemens-Schuckert 2 GU 345/38-8 double-acting electric motors producing a total of 750 metric horsepower (550 kW; 740 shp) for use while submerged. She had two shafts and two propellers. The boat was capable of operating at depths of up to 240 metres (790 ft).

The submarine had a maximum surface speed of 14.4–14.9 knots (26.7–27.6 km/h; 16.6–17.1 mph) and a maximum submerged speed of 6.2 knots (11.5 km/h; 7.1 mph). When submerged, the boat could operate for 120 nautical miles (220 km; 140 mi) at 2 knots (3.7 km/h; 2.3 mph); when surfaced, she could travel 12,350 nautical miles (22,870 km; 14,210 mi) at 10 knots (19 km/h; 12 mph). U-464 was not fitted with torpedo tubes or deck guns, but had two 3.7 cm (1.5 in) SK C/30 anti-aircraft guns with 2500 rounds as well as a 2 cm (0.79 in) C/30 guns with 3000 rounds. The boat had a complement of fifty-three.

== Operational career ==
U-464 was lost on her first patrol. As a supply boat, she avoided combat. She transited from Kiel to Bergen in Norway, arriving on 9 August 1942.

=== First and only patrol ===
U-464 set-off for her first patrol from Bergen on 14 August 1942. On the 20th, she was attacked south south-east of Iceland by a US PBY Catalina flying boat of VP-73. Two crew members were killed, there were 52 survivors. Although the aircraft dropped all its bombs without sinking the boat, she was still capable of making eight knots but was unable to dive. With many other ships and aircraft in the vicinity and realizing that the situation was hopeless, Harms decided to scuttle the boat near an Icelandic trawler, the 60 GRT Skaftfellingur.

What happened next is still open to question.

"English and Icelandic sources" on 'Uboat.net' say that the 52 German submariners were picked up by the seven-man crew of the fishing boat, put in the bows and covered by a machine gun on the bridge. They were then transferred to a pair of British destroyers later that same day.

The Kriegsmarine officially published a different version: namely that the U-boat crew boarded the trawler by force, captured its crew, and were heading for Germany when they were intercepted by the destroyers and taken prisoner.

In July 1999 a squadron of German Navy submarines visited Reykjavík to honor the Icelandic seamen who rescued the U-boat crew.

In 1942, Captain (later Admiral) Daniel V. Gallery was commander of the US PBY anti-submarine base in Keflavik, Iceland. Chapter 1 of his 1976 book Clear the Decks contains a detailed description of the U-464 incident with the Icelandic trawler which confirms the Kriegsmarine account. Some background: U-464 was the first of eight confirmed U-boat sinkings by Gallery's PBY squadron. Due to several botched attacks prior to this, Gallery had closed his base's Officers Club.

During the era of the closed club Lieutenant Hopgood, en route to meet a convoy coming up from England, caught the U-464 surfaced about fifty miles (80 km) from the convoy and crippled her so she couldn't submerge, but could still limp along on the surface. Hopgood expended all his depth charges on his first attack, and his single .30 caliber gun was useless against the sub's thick skin and heavy AA battery. In the messy weather the sub soon shook off our circling plane by running into a fog bank. Meantime, a British destroyer left the convoy at full speed in answer to Hoppy's radio report of his attack. Hopgood flew toward the convoy until he found the speeding destroyer, advised her how to steer, and then flew back to hunt for the U-boat again. By this time the fog had lifted a bit and he found the sub, heading for an Icelandic fishing vessel a few miles away. As Hopgood circled, the sub went alongside the little trawler and the Nazis boarded the fishing vessel, abandoned and scuttled the U-boat, and laid a course toward Germany. Hoppy duly reported all this by radio and spent the next couple of hours shuttling back and forth between the trawler and the oncoming destroyer, coaching the destroyer how to steer.

This was an exciting three hours in all the R.A.F. and Royal Navy operations rooms in England, as well as in ours up in Iceland. Hoppy's first electrifying messages telling that he had a cripple on his hands but couldn't finish it off had brought everybody in England to the operations rooms. For the rest of the morning Vice Admirals, Air Marshals and their staffs sat with their ears glued to the radio following the dramatic developments at sea. Hoppy's radio reports right up to the final one had been masterpieces of correct official phraseology giving a terse, clear and complete picture of all the essential details of the changing action as it occurred. Finally he came through with the big punch line that we were waiting for: "Destroyer is alongside trawler and has taken off fifty-two prisoners." Then, shifting from code to plain English he continued, "Personal message for Commander Gallery: Sank Sub—open club!"

We opened the club all right. We damned near blew the roof off the joint. But Coastal Command Headquarters in London were a bit puzzled over that final message, and even after the Air Commodore, Iceland, explained it to them, they considered it "most extraordinary."

https://www.vpnavy.org/vp73_1940.html (search page for "Hopgood") confirms Gallery's account. For his actions that day, Lt. Hopgood was awarded the US Navy Cross.

== Bibliography ==
- Busch, Rainer; Röll, Hans-Joachim (1999). German U-boat commanders of World War II : a biographical dictionary. Translated by Brooks, Geoffrey. London, Annapolis, Md: Greenhill Books, Naval Institute Press. ISBN 1-55750-186-6.
- Busch, Rainer; Röll, Hans-Joachim (1999). Deutsche U-Boot-Verluste von September 1939 bis Mai 1945 [German U-boat losses from September 1939 to May 1945]. Der U-Boot-Krieg (in German). Vol. IV. Hamburg, Berlin, Bonn: Mittler. ISBN 3-8132-0514-2.
- Gröner, Erich; Jung, Dieter; Maass, Martin (1991). U-boats and Mine Warfare Vessels. German Warships 1815–1945. Vol. 2. Translated by Thomas, Keith; Magowan, Rachel. London: Conway Maritime Press. ISBN 0-85177-593-4.
