= Type XIV submarine =

Class of resupply U-boats

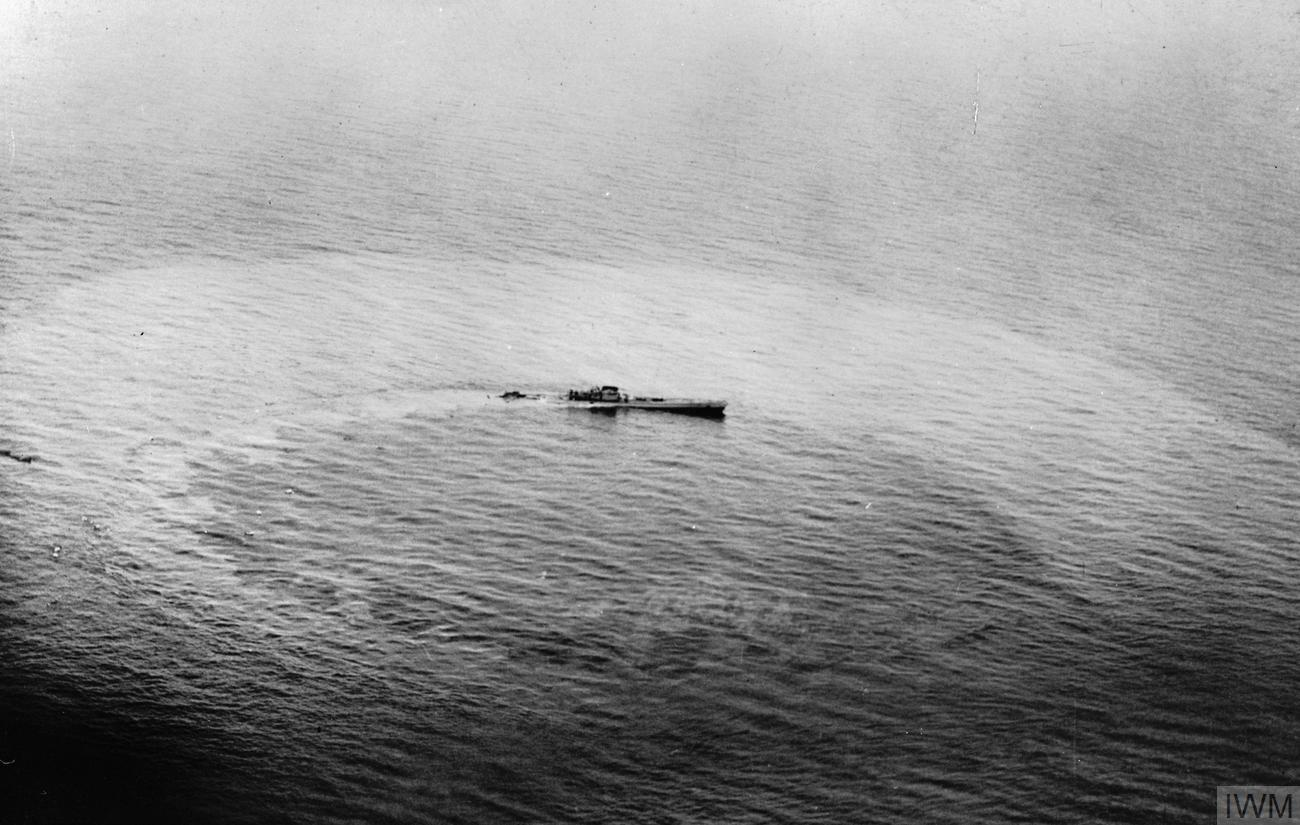
- U-459 sinking after being attacked by Vickers Wellington aircraft

Class overview
- Builders: Deutsche Werke (U-459 to U-464, U-487 to U-493); Germaniawerft (U-494 to U-500, U-2201-2204)
- Operators: Kriegsmarine
- Built: 1940–1943
- In commission: 1941–1944
- Planned: 24
- Completed: 10
- Canceled: 14
- Lost: 10

General characteristics
- Type: Submarine tanker
- Displacement: 1,688 t (1,661 long tons) surfaced; 1,932 t (1,901 long tons) submerged
- Length: 67.10 m (220 ft 2 in) o/a; 48.51 m (159 ft 2 in) pressure hull
- Beam: 9.35 m (30 ft 8 in) o/a; 4.90 m (16 ft 1 in) pressure hull
- Height: 11.70 m (38 ft 5 in)
- Draught: 6.51 m (21 ft 4 in)
- Installed power: 2,800–3,200 PS (2,100–2,400 kW; 2,800–3,200 bhp) (diesels); 750 PS (550 kW; 740 shp) (electric)
- Propulsion: 2 shafts; 2 × diesel engines; 2 × electric motors
- Speed: 14.4–14.9 knots (26.7–27.6 km/h; 16.6–17.1 mph) surfaced; 6.2 knots (11.5 km/h; 7.1 mph) submerged
- Range: 12,350 nmi (22,870 km; 14,210 mi) at 10 knots (19 km/h; 12 mph) surfaced; 55 nmi (102 km; 63 mi) at 4 knots (7.4 km/h; 4.6 mph) submerged
- Test depth: 240 m (790 ft)
- Capacity: 613 tonnes of fuel oil; 13 tonnes of lubricating oil; 4 × G7 torpedoes (in external below-deck canisters)
- Complement: 6 officers and 47 enlisted
- Armament: 2 × 3.7 cm (1.5 in) SK C/30 anti-aircraft guns; 1 × 2 cm (0.79 in) C/30 AA gun

The Type XIV U-boat was designed to supply other U-boats, being the only submarine tenders built which were not surface ships. It was nicknamed in German the "Milchkuh/Milchkühe (pl.)" (English: milk cow).

== Design ==
The Type XIV was based on the Type IXD long-range U-boat design, but with a shorter and deeper hull. The boats had a displacement of 1,688 tonnes (1,661 long tons) when at the surface and 1,932 tonnes (1,901 long tons) while submerged. The U-boats had a total length of 67.10 m (220 ft 2 in), a pressure hull length of 48.51 m (159 ft 2 in), a beam of 9.35 m (30 ft 8 in), a height of 11.70 m (38 ft 5 in), and a draught of 6.51 m (21 ft 4 in).

The Type XIV received the same powerplants as the Type VIIC : two Germaniawerft F46 supercharged four-stroke, six-cylinder diesel engines producing a total of 3,200 bhp (2,400 kW) for use while surfaced, two Siemens-Schuckert 2 GU 345/38-8 double-acting electric motors producing a total of 750 metric horsepower (550 kW; 740 shp) for use while submerged. They had two shafts and two propellers.

Since the cargo of Type XIV was mainly lightweight fuel, it was possible to assign more weight to the pressure hull, and instead of the usual 18.5 mm (0.73 in) thick steel, 21.5 mm (0.85 in) was used which resulted in a higher maximum diving depth of 240 metres (790 ft).

The submarines had a maximum surface speed of 14.4–14.9 knots (26.7–27.6 km/h; 16.6–17.1 mph) and a maximum submerged speed of 6.2 knots (11.5 km/h; 7.1 mph). When submerged, the boats could operate for 120 nautical miles (220 km; 140 mi) at 2 knots (3.7 km/h; 2.3 mph); when surfaced, they could travel 12,350 nautical miles (22,870 km; 14,210 mi) at 10 knots (19 km/h; 12 mph). The boats were not fitted with torpedo tubes nor deck guns. The only armament carried was for defense, consisting of two 3.7 cm (1.5 in) SK C/30 anti-aircraft guns with 2500 rounds as well as a 2 cm (0.79 in) C/30 gun with 3,000 rounds. The boats had a complement of fifty-three.

== Operation ==
Due to its large size, the Type XIV could resupply other boats with 613 t (603 long tons) of fuel, 13 t (13 long tons) of motor oil, four torpedoes, and fresh food that was preserved in refrigerator units. In addition, the boats were equipped with a small bakery in order to provide the luxury of fresh bread for crews being resupplied. The Type XIV also had a doctor and medical facility for injured sailors, and even had a two-man brig to imprison sailors awaiting discipline back at home. Type IXC boats otherwise only carried 12 weeks of food supplies, and a Type VIIC U-boat carried about 114 tons of diesel fuel.

Cargo was transported by means of a 6-metre (20 ft) inflatable boat and portable cranes. The flat main deck with cargo hatches and davits was designed in theory to facilitate the transfer of bulk supplies, however its low freeboard made this work extremely hazardous in typical North Atlantic swells that made the deck awash, so often supplies had to be hand-lifted through the smaller but drier conning tower hatches to avoid flooding the boat. Resupply and refueling operations often took hours, putting both the milk cow and the submarine it was servicing at risk.

If the Germans came under Allied attack during a resupply operation, the milk cow would dive first while the attack submarine might fight it out on the surface for a while, as the Type XIV's bulk and flat deck made it slower to maneuver and submerge, although it could dive deeper than Type VIICs or IX.CITEREFShortridge The Type XIV had no torpedo tubes or deck guns, only defensive armament of anti-aircraft guns.

The milk cows operated 300–400 miles (480–640 km) off the North American mainland in the so-called mid-Atlantic gap, far enough from Allied anti-submarine patrols and land-based aircraft while still close enough to provide logistical support to U-boats. In 1942, the milk cows enabled Type VIIC boats to remain on station for a couple more weeks off the American coast during the "Second Happy Time" raids of the Battle of the Atlantic.

The milk cows were priority targets for Allied forces, as sinking one milk cow would effectively curtail the patrols of a dozen attack U-boats and force them to return home for supplies. Ultra intercepts provided information concerning sailing and routing of the milk cows. This intelligence, coupled with improved Allied radar, air coverage, and hunter-killer groups in the North Atlantic, eliminated most of the milk cows during 1943 including four lost in the month of July alone. By the end of the war all ten had been sunk. Milk cow duty was especially hazardous; 289 sailors were killed out of an estimated complement of 530–576 men.

=== Losses during 1943 ===
On 24 July, U-tanker U-459 was destroyed two days out of Bordeaux. On 30 July, three U-boats, two of them Type XIVs, were attacked and destroyed by aircraft of the RAF and ships of Frederick Walker's 2nd Support Group. On 4 August, U-489 was sunk south of Iceland.

== List of Type XIV submarines ==
Type XIV U-boats
Boat	Commissioned	Notes
U-459	15 November 1941	Scuttled, 24 July 1943
U-460	24 December 1941	Sunk, 4 October 1943
U-461	30 January 1942	Sunk, 30 July 1943
U-462	5 March 1942	Sunk, 30 July 1943
U-463	2 April 1942	Sunk, 16 May 1943
U-464	30 April 1942	Scuttled, 20 August 1942
U-487	21 December 1942	Sunk, 13 July 1943
U-488	1 February 1943	Sunk, 26 April 1944
U-489	8 March 1943	Sunk on 4 August 1943
U-490	27 March 1943	Sunk, 12 June 1944

Fourteen planned Type XIVs were cancelled; U-491, U-492, U-493 were about 75 per cent complete when work was stopped in 1944. The other eleven boats had not been laid down when they were cancelled on 27 May 1944. On that same day Karl Dönitz stopped construction on the Type XX U-boats, large transport boats that would not have been ready until mid-1945.

== Bibliography ==
- Blair, Clay (1998). Hitler's U-boat War: The Hunted, 1942−1945. Vol. II. London: Cassell. ISBN 0-304-35261-6.
- Gröner, Erich; Jung, Dieter; Maass, Martin (1991). U-boats and mine warfare vessels. German Warships 1815–1945. Vol. 2. Translated by Thomas, Keith; Magowan, Rachel. London: Conway Maritime Press. ISBN 0-85177-593-4.
- Kemp, Paul (1999) [1997]. U-Boats Destroyed, German Submarine losses in the World Wars. London: Arms and Armour. ISBN 1-85409-515-3.
- Möller, Eberhard; Brack, Werner (2004). The Encyclopedia of U-Boats. London: Chatham. ISBN 1-85367-623-3.
- Niestlé, Axel (2014). German U-Boat Losses during World War II: Details of Destruction (2nd ed.). Barnsley: Frontline Books. ISBN 978-1-84832-210-3.
- Rössler, Eberhard (2001). The U-boat: The evolution and technical history of German submarines. London: Cassell & Co. ISBN 0-304-36120-8.
- Shortridge, Bud. Slaughtered "Milk Cows" (PDF).
- Williamson, Gordon (2005). Wolf Pack: The Story of the U-boat in World War II. Oxford: Osprey Publishing. ISBN 1-84176-872-3.
