= German submarine U-487 =

German World War II submarine

Coordinates: 27°15′N 34°18′W

History

Nazi Germany
- Name: U-487
- Ordered: 17 July 1941
- Builder: Germaniawerft, Kiel
- Yard number: 556
- Laid down: 31 December 1941
- Launched: 17 October 1942
- Commissioned: 21 December 1942
- Fate: Sunk on 13 July 1943

General characteristics
- Class & type: Type XIV ocean-going submarine tanker
- Displacement: 1,688 t (1,661 long tons) surfaced; 1,932 t (1,901 long tons) submerged
- Length: 67.10 m (220 ft 2 in) o/a; 48.51 m (159 ft 2 in) pressure hull
- Beam: 9.35 m (30 ft 8 in) o/a; 4.90 m (16 ft 1 in) pressure hull
- Height: 11.70 m (38 ft 5 in)
- Draught: 6.51 m (21 ft 4 in)
- Installed power: 2,800–3,200 PS (2,100–2,400 kW; 2,800–3,200 bhp) (diesels); 750 PS (550 kW; 740 shp) (electric)
- Propulsion: 2 shafts; 2 × diesel engines; 2 × electric motors
- Speed: 14.4–14.9 knots (26.7–27.6 km/h; 16.6–17.1 mph) surfaced; 6.2 knots (11.5 km/h; 7.1 mph) submerged
- Range: 12,350 nmi (22,870 km; 14,210 mi) at 10 knots (19 km/h; 12 mph) surfaced; 55 nmi (102 km; 63 mi) at 4 knots (7.4 km/h; 4.6 mph) submerged
- Test depth: 240 m (790 ft)
- Complement: 6 officers and 47 enlisted
- Armament: 2 × 3.7 cm (1.5 in) SK C/30 anti-aircraft guns; 1 × 2 cm (0.79 in) C/30 AA gun

Service record
- Part of: 4th U-boat Flotilla; 21 December 1942 – 31 March 1943; 12th U-boat Flotilla; 1 April 1943 – 13 July 1943
- Identification codes: M 49 344
- Commanders: Oblt.z.S. Helmut Metz; 21 December 1942 – 13 July 1943
- Operations: 2 patrols: 1st patrol: 27 March – 12 May 1943; 2nd patrol: 15 June – 13 July 1943
- Victories: None

German submarine U-487 was a Type XIV supply and replenishment U-boat ("Milchkuh") of Nazi Germany's Kriegsmarine during World War II.

Her keel was laid down 31 December 1941 by Germaniawerft in Kiel as yard number 556. She was launched on 17 October 1942 and commissioned on 21 December 1942 with Oberleutnant zur See Helmut Metz in command. Metz commanded the boat for its entire career.

Her service began with training as part of the 4th U-boat Flotilla. She then joined the 12th flotilla for operations.

== Design ==
German Type XIV submarines were shortened versions of the Type IXDs they were based on. U-487 had a displacement of 1,688 tonnes (1,661 long tons) when at the surface and 1,932 tonnes (1,901 long tons) while submerged. The U-boat had a total length of 67.10 m (220 ft 2 in), a pressure hull length of 48.51 m (159 ft 2 in), a beam of 9.35 m (30 ft 8 in), a height of 11.70 m (38 ft 5 in), and a draught of 6.51 m (21 ft 4 in). The submarine was powered by two Germaniawerft supercharged four-stroke, six-cylinder diesel engines producing a total of 2,800–3,200 metric horsepower (2,060–2,350 kW; 2,760–3,160 shp) for use while surfaced, two Siemens-Schuckert 2 GU 345/38-8 double-acting electric motors producing a total of 750 metric horsepower (550 kW; 740 shp) for use while submerged. She had two shafts and two propellers. The boat was capable of operating at depths of up to 240 metres (790 ft).

The submarine had a maximum surface speed of 14.4–14.9 knots (26.7–27.6 km/h; 16.6–17.1 mph) and a maximum submerged speed of 6.2 knots (11.5 km/h; 7.1 mph). When submerged, the boat could operate for 120 nautical miles (220 km; 140 mi) at 2 knots (3.7 km/h; 2.3 mph); when surfaced, she could travel 12,350 nautical miles (22,870 km; 14,210 mi) at 10 knots (19 km/h; 12 mph). U-487 was not fitted with torpedo tubes or deck guns, but had two 3.7 cm (1.5 in) SK C/30 anti-aircraft guns with 2500 rounds as well as a 2 cm (0.79 in) C/30 guns with 3000 rounds. The boat had a complement of fifty-three.

== Operational career ==
U-487 conducted two patrols. As a supply boat, she avoided combat.

=== First patrol ===
The U-boat departed Kiel on 27 March 1943, heading for the mid-Atlantic. She arrived in Bordeaux, in occupied France on 12 May.

=== Second patrol and loss ===
Her second patrol saw her leave Bordeaux on 15 June 1943. On 13 July, U-487 was attacked in the central Atlantic by five United States Navy Grumman TBF Avengers and Grumman F4F Wildcats from the escort carrier USS Core. The U-boat's crew were taken by surprise, so much so that sunbathers were seen on the casing. One Wildcat was shot down, but 31 men were killed and the U-boat sunk. The 33 survivors were taken prisoner on board USS Barker.

== Bibliography ==
- Busch, Rainer; Röll, Hans-Joachim (1999). German U-boat commanders of World War II : a biographical dictionary. Translated by Brooks, Geoffrey. London, Annapolis, Md: Greenhill Books, Naval Institute Press. ISBN 1-55750-186-6.
- Busch, Rainer; Röll, Hans-Joachim (1999). Deutsche U-Boot-Verluste von September 1939 bis Mai 1945 [German U-boat losses from September 1939 to May 1945]. Der U-Boot-Krieg (in German). Vol. IV. Hamburg, Berlin, Bonn: Mittler. ISBN 3-8132-0514-2.
- Gröner, Erich; Jung, Dieter; Maass, Martin (1991). U-boats and Mine Warfare Vessels. German Warships 1815–1945. Vol. 2. Translated by Thomas, Keith; Magowan, Rachel. London: Conway Maritime Press. ISBN 0-85177-593-4.
- Kemp, Paul (1999). U-Boats Destroyed – German Submarine Losses in the World Wars. London: Arms & Armour. ISBN 1-85409-515-3.
