= USS Core =

US Navy escort carrier

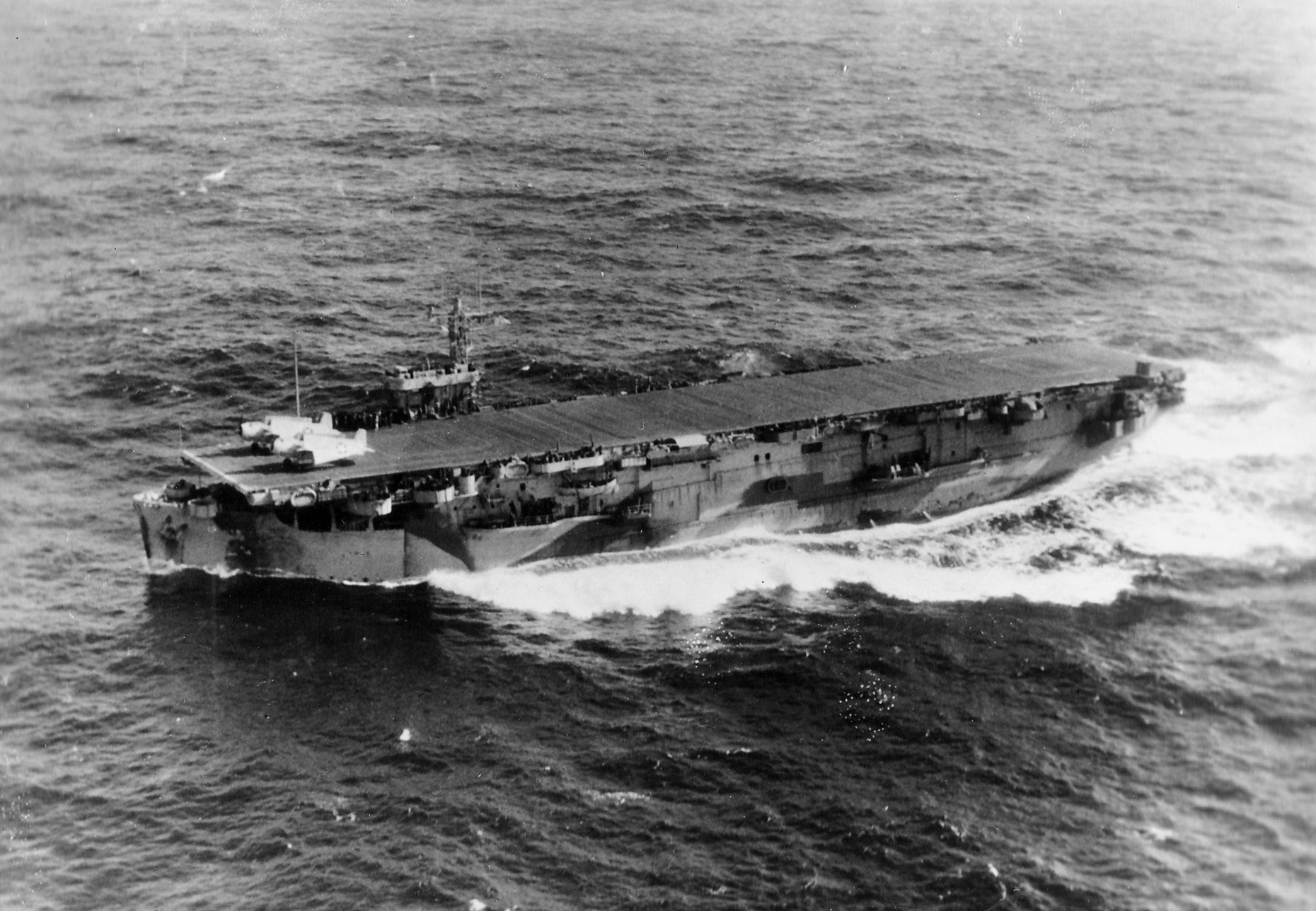
- USS Core c. 1944

History

United States
- Name: USS Core
- Namesake: Core Sound in North Carolina
- Laid down: 2 January 1942
- Launched: 15 May 1942
- Commissioned: 10 December 1942
- Decommissioned: 4 October 1946
- Fate: Sold for scrap, 1971

General characteristics
- Class & type: Bogue-class escort carrier
- Displacement: 7,800 tons
- Length: 495.7 ft (151.1 m)
- Beam: 69.5 ft (21.2 m)
- Draft: 26 ft (7.9 m)
- Speed: 17 knots (31 km/h; 20 mph)
- Complement: 890 officers and men
- Armament: 2 × 5 inch guns

USS Core (CVE-13), a Bogue-class escort carrier named for Core Sound in North Carolina, was built under a United States Maritime Commission contract at the Tacoma, Washington yard of the Seattle-Tacoma Shipbuilding Company as MC Hull No. 179. Sponsored by Mrs. B. B. Smith, wife of Lieutenant Commander Smith, she was laid down on 2 January 1942; acquired by the U..S. Navy on 1 May 1942; launched on 15 May 1942; and commissioned on 10 December 1942, Captain M. R. Greer in command. She was originally designated as AVG (Aircraft Escort Vessel)-13, but was reclassified as an Auxiliary Aircraft Carrier (ACV) on 20 August 1942; as an Escort Aircraft Carrier (CVE) on 15 July 1943; as an Escort Aircraft Carrier, Helicopter (CVHE) on 12 June 1955; as a Utility Aircraft Carrier (CVU) on 1 July 1958; and as a Cargo Ship and Aircraft Ferry (T-AKV-41) on 7 May 1959.

== Service history ==
Clearing Puget Sound 6 February 1943, Core qualified pilots in carrier operations off San Diego, then sailed on to the east coast, arriving at Norfolk 11 April. She continued to train pilots in Chesapeake Bay until 27 June when she sortied as the flagship of TG 21.12, a hunter-killer group. The organization of such groups within the U.S. Navy had begun in the wake of the Washington Convoy Conference of March 1943. At this meeting the U.S. Navy withdrew from convoy-protection duties along the direct U.S.-to-Britain convoy route, shifting its focus to protecting convoys destined for the Mediterranean. The American HKGs, like British groups organized during the previous year, provided distant coverage to convoys, supplementing surface vessels providing direct escortbwhen so ordered. Unlike the British groups, which consisted entirely of surface vessels (sloops, frigates, and corvettes) with highly trained, experienced crews, each American HKG was built around an escort carrier, with three to six destroyers or destroyer-escorts attached. While administratively part of the U.S. Second (mid-Atlantic) Fleet, these groups' most important role was serving as the cutting edge of the newly organized U.S. Tenth Fleet, a command formed by Admiral Ernest King (and kept under his direct command) for the purpose of conducting offensive operations against German submarines. King's organization took responsibility for pulling together and analyzing all available evidence on submarine movements, and then pulling rank to assert control over any vessels, under any command (Tenrh Fleet had no ships or aircraft of its own), that were in a position to strike against them. The HKGs were the most powerful tools available, and were used preferentially whenever feasible, making a contribution of disproportional significance to winning the Battle of the Atlantic. On this first deployment Core's HKG scored a number of successes: her planes sank U-487 on 13 July 1943, at 27°15′N 34°18′W, and U-67 on 16 July at 30°05′N 44°17′W, and one of her escorts, George E. Badger, sank U-613 on 23 July, at 35°32′N 28°36′W. Core returned to Norfolk 31 July from a most successful first patrol.

On Core's second hunter-killer patrol, from 16 August to 2 September 1943, her planes sank U-84 on 24 August at 27°09′N 37°03′W, and U-185 the same day at 27°00′N 37°06′W. Putting to sea again 5 October in TG 21.15, Core's planes sank U-378 on 20 October at 47°40′N 28°27′W. She returned to Norfolk 19 November.

Following another hunter-killer patrol from 6 December 1943 to 18 January 1944, Core ferried 56 P-51s and other cargo to Liverpool from 6 February to 9 March. From 3 April to 29 May, she operated with TG 21.16 in the central and North Atlantic, then sailed from New York 24 June to ferry 85 Army aircraft to Glasgow, Scotland, returning to Norfolk 20 July. Returning to antisubmarine operations 8 August as CTG 22.4, Core conducted training exercises against newly revealed enemy submarine tactics off Bermuda until 8 October when she returned to Norfolk for an overhaul. After a period qualifying carrier pilots at Quonset Point, she sailed from Norfolk 24 January 1945 to lead her group against weather reporting submarines operating in the North Atlantic, but fog and rough weather prevented successful attacks. She sailed from Norfolk 3 April to join a large antisubmarine unit at Guantanamo Bay 7 April. Operating in the central and North Atlantic as part of Operation Teardrop, the escorts of this group combined to sink U-546 on 24 April at 43°53′N 40°07′W, after the enemy submarine had torpedoed and sunk Frederick C. Davis. Core returned to New York 11 May for repairs and replenishment.

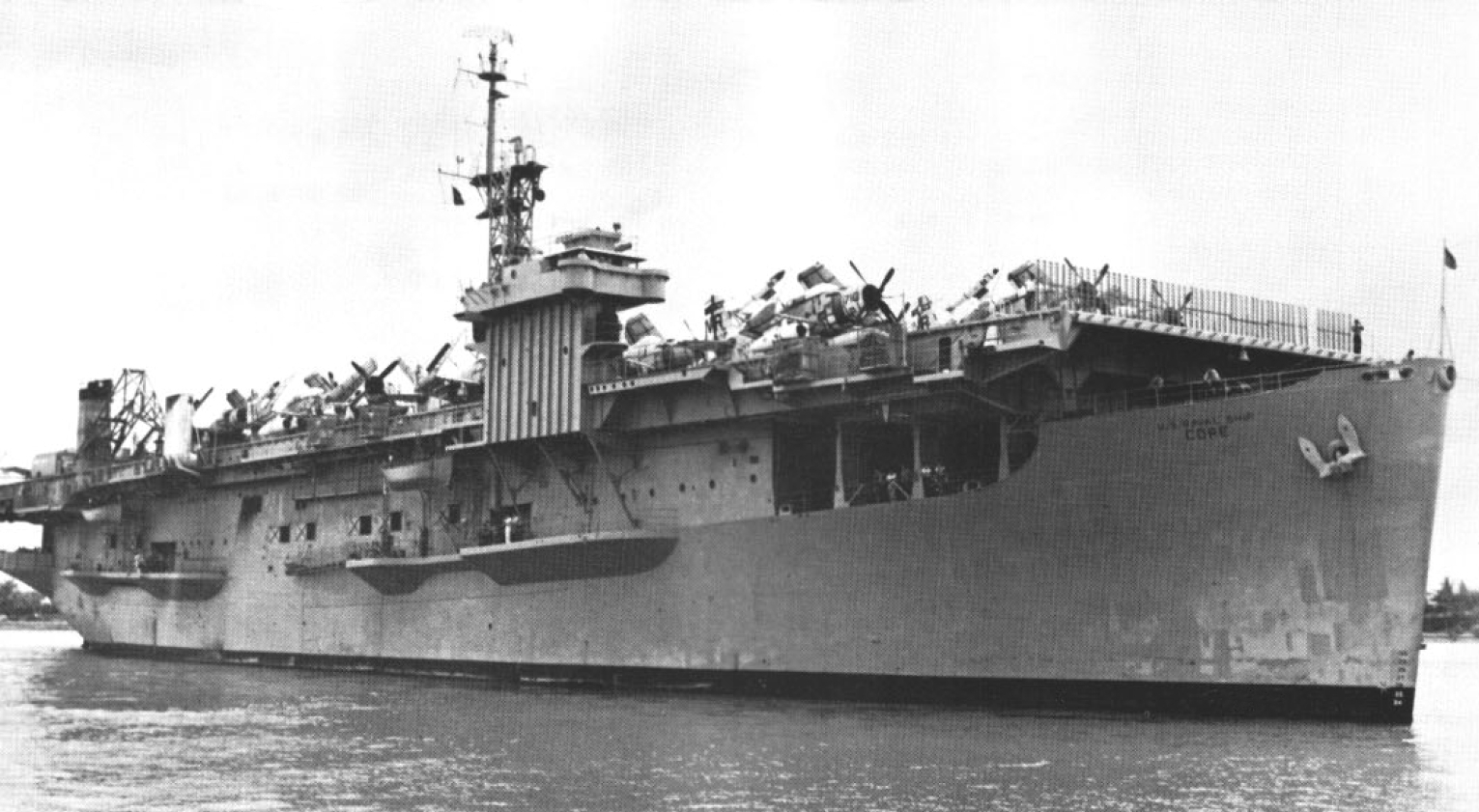
Core transporting aircraft to Vietnam, 1967.

Clearing Norfolk 13 June 1945, Core arrived at San Diego 25 June. She carried aircraft and aviation personnel to Pearl Harbor and to Samar, returning 30 August. Until 20 October, she sailed between Alameda and Seattle on transport duty then sailed for Yokosuka, Japan, on "Magic Carpet" duty, to return homeward-bound servicemen. She made two such voyages from 20 October 1945 to 18 January 1946. Core was placed out of commission in reserve 4 October 1946 at Port Angeles, Washington.

The ship was redesignated as a helicopter escort carrier (CVHE-13) 12 June 1955, a utility carrier (CVU-13) 1 July 1958 and finally an aviation transport (T-AKV-41) 7 May 1959. On 11 December 1961, the USNS Core docked in the Saigon Port to unload 32 H-21 Shawnee helicopters and more than 400 U.S. soldiers from the 57th Transportation Company (Light Helicopter) from Fort Lewis, and the 8th Transportation Company (Light Helicopter) from Fort Bragg.

Core was stricken for disposal on 15 September 1970 and sold for scrap in 1971.

== Awards ==
Core received one battle star for World War II service.

== Sources ==
- JFK Day by Day by Terry Golway and Les Krantz (Running Press 2010)
