= German–Japanese industrial co-operation before and during World War II =

Industrial cooperation between Germany and the Empire of Japan

In the years leading up to the outbreak of World War II in Europe in 1939, there was some significant collaborative development in heavy industry between German companies and their Japanese counterparts as part of the two nation's evolving relations. This was one major factor in Japan's ability to quickly exploit raw materials in the areas of the Empire of Japan that had recently come under their military control.

== Lurgi group plants ==
Nippon Lurgi Goshi KK was a Japanese company of the period involved in Japanese-German cooperation. The Lurgi AG German industrial group was a partner, and it was the Lurgi office in Tokyo. The Combined Intelligence Objectives Sub-committee of the United States and United Kingdom later investigated it.

At the beginning of 1942 the Japanese acquired all the low temperature carbonization patents of Lurgi for Japan, Manchuria, and of China. The agreement gave the Japanese the right to construct plants and an exclusive use of patents. A flat payment of approximately 800,000 Reichsmark, was received from the Japanese, this sum being cleared through the German government. One of the aims was synthetic oil. For example, the South Sakhalin Mining and Railway Company plant at Naihoro/Oichai in Karafuto perhaps motivated the licensing: the southern Karafuto brown coal with a content of paraffin tar (about 15%), and low water content, was suitable for hydrogenation.

- Mitsui Kosan KK Miiki (Ohmura) operated from about 1939. Lurgi AG installed an activated carbon plant to operate with the Fischer–Tropsch plant. Coke and water gas were produced, the coke ovens being built by Koppers.
- The shale plant at Fushun (Japanese Bujum), Manchuria, was perhaps capable of annual production of 200,000 tons of shale oil. The Imperial Japanese Navy also had an interest there in producing some diesel oil and gasoline, in low amounts.
- The Manshu Gosei Nenryo plant at Jinzhou (Kinshu), was a Fischer–Tropsch plant producing about 30,000 tons per year, online from about 1940.
- Near Beijing, in Hebei, the Kalgari factory was to develop the local bituminous coal. It could be used also for the Mengjiang coal of the Chahar–Suiyuan mines.
- A planned gasification plant at Rumoe in Hokkaidō was apparently not built.
- Chosen Sekitan KK at Eian was a small low temperature carbonization plant which was processed about 600 tons of coal per day. This plant yielded from 15,000 to 20,000 tons per annum of coal tar.

== With Koppers ==
Ube Yuka Kogya KK (No.2), at Ube was a low temperature carbonization plant, with a synthetic ammonia plant. This was a collaboration with Heinrich Koppers AG of Essen.

== Japanese–German military technology collaboration ==
=== Aircraft ===
It is known that Japan and Germany signed agreements on military technological collaboration, both before the 1939 outbreak of World War II, and during the conflict. However, the first air technology interchange occurred during World War I when Japan joined against Germany on the side of the Allies, and Germany lost a Rumpler Taube aircraft at Tsingtao, which the Japanese rebuilt as the Isobe Kaizo Rumpler Taube, as well as an LVG, known to the Japanese as the Seishiki-1, in 1916.

After the war had ended the Japanese purchased licences for the Hansa-Brandenburg W.33 which was built as the Yokosho Navy Type Hansa in 1922, and as the Aichi Type 15-ko "Mi-go" in 1925.

During World War II the Japanese Navy traded a Nakajima E8N "Dave" reconnaissance seaplane (itself a multi-generational development of the Vought O2U to Germany, later seen in British markings on the German raider Orion, and some sources mention the probable dispatch of a Mitsubishi Ki-46 "Dinah", among other weapons.

In the other direction:

- The German Focke-Wulf company sent a Focke-Wulf Fw 190 A-5, and was contracted to send a Focke-Wulf Fw 200 V-10 (S-1) or Focke-Wulf Ta 152.
- The Heinkel company sent examples of the Heinkel He 50 A (manufactured in Japan by Aichi as the D1A1, Allied codename "Susie"), Heinkel He 70 "Blitz", Heinkel He 111fs, Heinkel He 112 (V12,12 B-0, Japanese designation A7He1), Heinkel He 100 D-1 (in Japan designated AXHe1), Heinkel He 116 (V5/6), and Heinkel He 118 (DXHe/Yokosuka D4Y Suisei), Heinkel He 119 V7 and V8, Heinkel HD 25, Heinkel HD 62, Heinkel HD 28, Heinkel HD 23, Heinkel He 162 "Volksjager" under the variant named Tachikawa Ki 162, and Heinkel He 177 A-7 "Greif" designs.
- The Bücker company sent its Bücker Bü 131 Jungmann which in Japan was designated the Kokusai Ki-86 (Army) or Kyūshū K9W (Navy).
- Dornier sent its Dornier Do 16 Wal (in Japan made by Kawasaki as the KDN-1), Dornier Do N built as the Kawasaki Army Type 87 heavy bomber, and the Dornier Do C.
- Fieseler sent the Fieseler Fi-103 Reichenberg, and Fieseler Fi 156 Storch (redesigned by the Japanese and produced as the Kobeseiko Te-Gō).
- The Junkers company sent its Junkers K 37 (developed by the Japanese as the Mitsubishi Ki-1 and Ki-2), Junkers G.38b K51 (Japanese design Mitsubishi Ki-20), Junkers Ju 88 A-1, Junkers Ju 52, Junkers Ju 87 A, Junkers Ju 86 and made sales of its Junkers Ju 290, Junkers Ju 390 and Junkers Ju 488 designs.
- The Messerschmitt company sold the Messerschmitt Bf 109 E-3/4, Messerschmitt Bf 110, Messerschmitt Me 210 A-2, Messerschmitt Me 163 A/B "Komet" (a Japanese design based only on the partial drawings received was the Mitsubishi J8M/Ki-202 Shusui rocket interceptor) and Messerschmitt Me 262 A-1a whose design influenced the Nakajima Ki-201 Karyu; and studied the possibility of the use of the Messerschmitt Me 264. Also sent was the design of the Messerschmitt Me 509, which may have influenced the design of the Yokosuka R2Y1 Keiun reconnaissance plane.
- The Arado company sent an example of Arado Ar 196 A-4, which had been traded for the Nakajima E8N.
- Focke-Achgelis sent its design Focke-Achgelis Fa 330 Bachstelze, an observation aircraft for submarines, and other aircraft examples.

When it came to aircraft equipment, the Japanese Army fighter Kawasaki Ki-61 Hien ("Tony") used a licence-built Daimler-Benz DB 601A engine which resulted in the Allies believing that it was either a Messerschmitt Bf 109 or an Italian Macchi C.202 Folgore until they examined captured examples. It was also fitted with Mauser MG 151/20 20 mm cannons also built under licence.

=== Rockets ===
According to decrypted messages from the Japanese embassy in Germany, twelve dismantled V-2 (A-4) rockets were shipped to Japan. These left Bordeaux in August 1944 on the U-219 and U-195 and reached Djakarta in December 1944. Civilian V-2 expert Heinz Schlicke was a passenger on the U-234 when it departed Kristiansand, Norway for Japan in May 1945, shortly before the war ended in Europe. The fate of these V-2 rockets is unknown.

=== Vehicles ===
There are other cases of military technology interchange. The Ho-Ru SPG with 47 mm AT cannon, resembled the German Hetzer tank destroyer combined with wheel guide pins like the T-34. The heavy tank destroyers Ho-Ri I and II, armed with a 105 mm cannon, seem to have been influenced by German Jagd heavy tanks Elefant and Jagdtiger. The Type 4 Chi-To medium tank, armed with a 75 mm cannon, and the Type 5 Chi-Ri medium tank, armed with 75 or 88 mm cannon, were influenced by the Panther, Tiger I, and Tiger II German tanks. The Type 1 Ho-Ha half-track armoured personnel carrier was similar to the German Sd.Kfz. 251 armoured fighting vehicle.

Japanese Ambassador General Hiroshi Ōshima in the name of Japanese Army bought one example of the Panzerkampfwagen PzKpfw VI Ausf E Tiger I tank with additional equipment.

=== Submarines ===
The Japanese Navy received examples of the German Type IXD2 submarine Ausf "Monsun" and other submarines, including the Type IXC's U-511 (RO-500) and U-1224 (RO-501), and after the German surrender, interned the Type IXD2's U-181 (I-501) and U-862 (I-502), the captured Italian submarines Comandante Cappellini, (I-503), and Luigi Torelli (I-504), which had become Foreign U-boats UIT-24 and UIT-25, and the German Type X submarine U-219 (I-505), the Type IXD1 U-195 (I-506). Japan also received Flakvierling anti-aircraft cannons, with a disarmed V-2, etc. as well.

Japanese Navy received later in last war stages from Germans, some advanced technology of Type XXI "Elektro-boote" class for designed The Sen Taka (submarine, high speed) and Sen Taka Sho (submarine, high speed, small) models, in high bursts of speed, could run faster submerged than on the surface for up to an hour, only comparable in underwater speed to the I-201-class was the German related sub type.

=== Ships ===
In 1935, a German technical mission arrived in Japan to sign accords and licenses to use the technology from the Akagi-class aircraft carrier for use in the German aircraft carriers Graf Zeppelin and Flugzeugträger B (both later cancelled) from Deutsche Werke Kiel A.G.

They also acquired the technical data on the adaptations to the Messerschmitt Bf 109T/E and Junkers Ju 87C/E, for use on such carriers. This technology was also applied in the following aircraft:

- Fieseler Fi 156
- Fieseler Fi 167
- Arado Ar 95/195
- Arado Ar 96B
- Arado Ar 197
- Heinkel He 50
- Avia B 534. IV

== Other military technology collaborations ==
To put this in perspective, the Japanese also bought licences and acquired aircraft (sometimes singly and sometimes in large quantities) from most of the western countries. These included the United Kingdom (with which it had a close relationship up until shortly after the end of World War I) and whose De Havilland aircraft were extensively used, France, who supplied a huge variety of aircraft of all types from 1917 through to the 1930s, and whose Nieuport-Delage NiD 29 fighter provided the Japanese Army Air Force with its first modern fighter aircraft, as well as the bias toward extremely manoeuvrable aircraft. The United States of America supplied the Douglas DC-4E and Douglas DC-5, the North American NA-16 (precursor to the T-6/SNJ) as well as others too many to list. This resulted in many Japanese aircraft being discounted as being copies of Western designs - which from 1935 onwards was rarely the case except for trainers and light transports where development could be accelerated, the Nakajima Ki-201 and Mitsubishi J8M being rare exceptions.

== Later developments ==
By 1944, Japan was to rely heavily on the Nippon-German Technical Exchange Agreement, obtaining manufacturing rights, intelligence, blueprints, and in some cases, actual airframes for several of Germany's new air weapons. These included the Me 163 Komet (developed as the Mitsubishi J8M Shusui), the BMW 003 axial-flow jet engine (which was reworked to Japanese standards as the Ishikawajima Ne-20), information on the Me 262 which resulted in the Nakajima J9Y Kikka), data on the Fiesler Fi-103R series (which culminated in the development of the Kawanishi Baika), and even data on the Bachem Ba 349 Natter point-defense interceptor.

=== Nakajima Kikka ===
While the Nakajima Kikka bore some resemblance to the German Me 262, it was only superficial, even though the Ne-20 engines which powered the Kikka were the Japanese equivalent of the German BMW 003 engine which initially powered the Me 262 prototype. Also, the Kikka was envisioned from the outset not as a fighter, but as a special attack bomber and was only armed with a bomb payload. It is wrongly considered that this aircraft registration was J9Y or J10N, although this aircraft was never registered.

== See also ==
- Germany–Japan relations
