= German submarine U-118 =

U-118 may refer to one of the following German submarines:

- SM U-118, a Type UE II submarine launched in 1918 that served in World War I and was surrendered in 1919
  - During World War I, Germany also had this submarine with a similar name:
    - SM UB-118, a Type UB III submarine launched in 1917 and surrendered in 1918
- German submarine U-118 (1941), a Type XB submarine that served in World War II and was sunk on 12 June 1943
