= German submarine U-525 =

German World War II submarine

Coordinates: 06.20°S 111.28°E

History

Nazi Germany
- Name: U-525
- Ordered: 15 August 1940
- Builder: Deutsche Werft, Hamburg
- Yard number: 340
- Laid down: 10 September 1941
- Launched: 20 May 1942
- Commissioned: 30 July 1942
- Fate: Sunk on 11 August 1943

General characteristics
- Class & type: Type IXC/40 submarine
- Displacement: 1,144 t (1,126 long tons) surfaced; 1,257 t (1,237 long tons) submerged
- Length: 76.76 m (251 ft 10 in) o/a; 58.75 m (192 ft 9 in) pressure hull
- Beam: 6.86 m (22 ft 6 in) o/a; 4.44 m (14 ft 7 in) pressure hull
- Height: 9.60 m (31 ft 6 in)
- Draught: 4.67 m (15 ft 4 in)
- Installed power: 4,400 PS (3,200 kW; 4,300 bhp) (diesels); 1,000 PS (740 kW; 990 shp) (electric)
- Propulsion: 2 shafts; 2 × diesel engines; 2 × electric motors
- Speed: 18.3 knots (33.9 km/h; 21.1 mph) surfaced; 7.3 knots (13.5 km/h; 8.4 mph) submerged
- Range: 13,850 nmi (25,650 km; 15,940 mi) at 10 knots (19 km/h; 12 mph) surfaced; 63 nmi (117 km; 72 mi) at 4 knots (7.4 km/h; 4.6 mph) submerged
- Test depth: 230 m (750 ft)
- Complement: 4 officers, 44 enlisted
- Armament: 6 × torpedo tubes (4 bow, 2 stern); 22 × 53.3 cm (21 in) torpedoes; 1 × 10.5 cm (4.1 in) SK C/32 deck gun (180 rounds); 1 × 3.7 cm (1.5 in) SK C/30 AA gun; 1 × twin 2 cm FlaK 30 AA guns

Service record
- Part of: 4th U-boat Flotilla; 30 July – 31 December 1942; 10th U-boat Flotilla; 1 January – 11 August 1943
- Commanders: Kptlt. / K.Kapt. Hans-Joachim Drewitz; 30 July 1942 – 11 August 1943
- Operations: 3 patrols: 1st patrol: 15 December 1942 – 3 March 1943; 2nd patrol: a. 15 April – 26 May 1943; b. 25 – 26 July 1943; 3rd patrol: 27 July – 11 August 1943
- Victories: 1 merchant ship sunk (3,454 GRT)

German submarine U-525 was a Type IXC/40 U-boat of Nazi Germany's Kriegsmarine built for service during World War II.

Her keel was laid down on 10 September 1941 by the Deutsche Werft in Hamburg as yard number 340. She was launched on 20 May 1942 and commissioned on 30 July with Kapitänleutnant Hans-Joachim Drewitz in command.

The U-boat's service began with training as part of the 4th U-boat Flotilla on 30 July 1942. She then moved to the 10th flotilla on 1 January 1943 for operations.

She was a member of six wolfpacks.

She carried out three patrols and sank one ship of 3,454 GRT.

She was sunk by US aircraft, northwest of the Azores on 11 August 1943.

== Design and construction ==
German Type IXC/40 submarines were slightly larger than the original Type IXCs. U-525 had a displacement of 1,144 tonnes (1,126 long tons) when at the surface and 1,257 tonnes (1,237 long tons) while submerged. The U-boat had a total length of 76.76 m (251 ft 10 in), a pressure hull length of 58.75 m (192 ft 9 in), a beam of 6.86 m (22 ft 6 in), a height of 9.60 m (31 ft 6 in), and a draught of 4.67 m (15 ft 4 in). The submarine was powered by two MAN M 9 V 40/46 supercharged four-stroke, nine-cylinder diesel engines producing a total of 4,400 metric horsepower (3,240 kW; 4,340 shp) for use while surfaced, two Siemens-Schuckert 2 GU 345/34 double-acting electric motors producing a total of 1,000 shaft horsepower (1,010 PS; 750 kW) for use while submerged. She had two shafts and two 1.92 m (6 ft) propellers. The boat was capable of operating at depths of up to 230 metres (750 ft).

The submarine had a maximum surface speed of 18.3 knots (33.9 km/h; 21.1 mph) and a maximum submerged speed of 7.3 knots (13.5 km/h; 8.4 mph). When submerged, the boat could operate for 63 nautical miles (117 km; 72 mi) at 4 knots (7.4 km/h; 4.6 mph); when surfaced, she could travel 13,850 nautical miles (25,650 km; 15,940 mi) at 10 knots (19 km/h; 12 mph). U-525 was fitted with six 53.3 cm (21 in) torpedo tubes (four fitted at the bow and two at the stern), 22 torpedoes, one 10.5 cm (4.13 in) SK C/32 naval gun, 180 rounds, and a 3.7 cm (1.5 in) SK C/30 as well as a 2 cm (0.79 in) C/30 anti-aircraft gun. The boat had a complement of forty-eight.

U-525 was one of eight Type IX/C40 submarines ordered from Deutsche Werft on 16 August 1940. The submarine was laid down at Deutsche Werft's Hamburg shipyard on 10 September 1941, as yard number 309. She was launched on 20 May 1942 and commissioned on 30 July 1942.

== Service history ==
On commissioning, U-525 joined the 4th U-boat Flotilla based at Stettin, Prussia (now Szczecin, Poland) for crew training. On completion of training, she joined the operational 10th U-boat Flotilla.

=== First patrol ===
The submarine's first patrol took her from Kiel on 15 December 1942, across the North Sea and into the Atlantic Ocean through the gap between Iceland and the Faroe Islands. U-525, together with U-357 and U-384 were planned to form the core of a new patrol group, Falke, which was to be deployed against westbound convoys. On 26 December, U-357 sighted the east-bound convoy HX 219, and U-525 and U-384 were ordered directed to join U-357 in attacking the convoy, but U-357 was sunk by the convoy's escort later that day, and neither U-525 or U-384 managed to find the convoy. U-525 continued to form part of Falke until 19 January 1943, when the group was disbanded, with U-525 joining Haudegen group, patrolling south of Cape Farewell, Greenland. Haudegen group was broken up on 15 February 1943, with U-525 ordered to remain off Newfoundland. On 17 March, U-69 sighted Convoy ONS 165, and sent a contact report allowing other submarines to be directed to the convoy. On 20 February, U-525 torpedoed the British freighter Radhurst east of Newfoundland. Radhurst sank in three minutes, with the loss of all aboard.

In late February, the homebound U-525 was refuelled by U-460 north of the Azores. On the night of 2/3 March 1943, U-525 was attacked and badly damaged by a Leigh Light equipped Wellington anti-submarine aircraft of 172 Squadron RAF in the Bay of Biscay. U-525 arrived at her new home port of Lorient in occupied France, on 3 March.

=== Second patrol ===
After repair from the damage received in the air attack of 2/3 March, U-525 left on her second patrol on 15 April 1943. The submarine joined group Amsel, a line of 13 submarines that ran from north east of Newfoundland to the southeast, with the intention of intercepting eastbound convoys. On 5 May, Amsel was split up into four smaller groups spread east of St. John's, Newfoundland and Labrador, with U-525 part of Amsel 3. On 7 May, Amsel 3 and Amsel 4 were combined to form Rhein group, which was sent south east to intercept Convoy HX 237, and then Convoy SC 129. U-525 managed to engage neither of the two convoys. She returned to Lorient on 26 May 1943.

=== Third patrol and loss ===
On 27 July 1943, U525 left Lorient on her third patrol to the Atlantic. The loss of two Type XIV tanker submarines, U-462 and U-463, on 30 July 1943 resulted in U-Boat Control diverting U-525 to refuel homecoming submarines south and south west of the Azores. She did not make her rendezvous with the returning submarines, as on 11 August, a Avenger and Wildcat from the American carrier Card caught the submarine on the surface north west of the Azores. The Wildcat made a strafing attack on the submarine, followed by the Avenger, which dropped two depth charges. U-525 then dived, trailing oil, and the Avenger dropped an acoustic torpedo which struck the submarine just aft of the conning tower, sinking her. Fifty-four men died; there were no survivors.

=== Wolfpacks ===
U-525 took part in six wolfpacks, namely:

- Falke (28 December 1942 – 19 January 1943)
- Haudegen (19 January – 15 February 1943)
- Amsel (22 April – 3 May 1943)
- Amsel 3 (3 – 6 May 1943)
- Rhein (7 – 10 May 1943)
- Elbe 1 (10 – 14 May 1943)

== Summary of raiding history ==
Date	Ship Name	Nationality	Tonnage (GRT)	Fate
20 February 1943	Radhurst	United Kingdom	3,454	Sunk

== Bibliography ==
- Blair, Clay (2000). Hitler's U-Boat War: The Hunted 1942–1945. New York: Modern Library. ISBN 0-679-64033-9.
- Busch, Rainer; Röll, Hans-Joachim (1999). German U-boat commanders of World War II : a biographical dictionary. Translated by Brooks, Geoffrey. London, Annapolis, Md: Greenhill Books, Naval Institute Press. ISBN 1-55750-186-6.
- Busch, Rainer; Röll, Hans-Joachim (1999). Deutsche U-Boot-Verluste von September 1939 bis Mai 1945 [German U-boat losses from September 1939 to May 1945]. Der U-Boot-Krieg (in German). Vol. IV. Hamburg, Berlin, Bonn: Mittler. ISBN 3-8132-0514-2.
- Edwards, Bernard (1996). Dönitz and the Wolf Packs – The U-boats at War. Cassell Military Classics. p. 152. ISBN 0-304-35203-9.
- Gröner, Erich; Jung, Dieter; Maass, Martin (1991). U-boats and Mine Warfare Vessels. German Warships 1815–1945. Vol. 2. Translated by Thomas, Keith; Magowan, Rachel. London: Conway Maritime Press. ISBN 0-85177-593-4.
- Kemp, Paul (1997). U-Boats Destroyed – German Submarine Losses in the World Wars. Arms & Armour. ISBN 1-85409-515-3.
- Niestlé, Axel (2014). German U-Boat Losses During World War II: Details of Destruction. Barnsley, UK: Frontline Books. ISBN 978-1-84832-210-3.
- Wynn, Kenneth (1998). U-Boat Operations of the Second World War: Volume 2: Career Histories, U511–UIT25. London: Chatham Publishing. ISBN 1-86176-069-8.
