= German submarine U-119 (1942) =

German World War II submarine

Coordinates: 44°59′N 12°24′W

History

Nazi Germany
- Name: U-119
- Ordered: 7 August 1939
- Builder: Germaniawerft, Kiel
- Yard number: 624
- Laid down: 15 May 1940
- Launched: 6 January 1942
- Commissioned: 2 April 1942
- Fate: Sunk on 24 June 1943

General characteristics
- Class & type: Type X submarine minelayer
- Displacement: 1,763 tonnes (1,735 long tons) surfaced; 2,177 tonnes (2,143 long tons) submerged
- Length: 89.80 m (294 ft 7 in) o/a; 70.90 m (232 ft 7 in) pressure hull
- Beam: 9.20 m (30 ft 2 in) o/a; 4.75 m (15 ft 7 in) pressure hull
- Height: 10.20 m (33 ft 6 in)
- Draught: 4.71 m (15 ft 5 in)
- Propulsion: 2 × supercharged GW F 46 a 9 pu 9 cylinder, four-stroke diesel engines, 4,800 PS (4,700 bhp; 3,500 kW); 2 × AEG GU 720/8-287 electric motors, 1,100 PS (1,100 shp; 810 kW)
- Speed: 16.4–17 knots (30.4–31.5 km/h; 18.9–19.6 mph) surfaced; 7 knots (13 km/h; 8.1 mph) submerged
- Range: 18,450 nautical miles (34,170 km; 21,230 mi) at 10 knots (19 km/h; 12 mph) surfaced; 93 nmi (172 km; 107 mi) at 4 knots (7.4 km/h; 4.6 mph) submerged
- Test depth: Calculated crush depth: 220 m (720 ft)
- Complement: 5 officers, 47 enlisted
- Armament: 2 × 53.3 cm (21 in) stern torpedo tubes; 15 × torpedoes; 66 × SMA mines; 1 × 10.5 cm (4.1 in) deck gun (200 rounds)

Service record
- Part of: 4th U-boat Flotilla; 2 April 1942 – 31 January 1943; 12th U-boat Flotilla; 1 February – 24 June 1943
- Identification codes: M 43 666
- Commanders: Kptlt. Alois Zech; 2 April 1942 – 16 April 1943; Kptlt. Horst-Tessen von Kameke; 15 April – 24 June 1943
- Operations: 2 patrols: 1st patrol: 6 February – 1 April 1943; 2nd patrol: 25 April – 24 June 1943
- Victories: 1 merchant ship sunk (2,937 GRT); 1 merchant ship damaged (7,176 GRT)

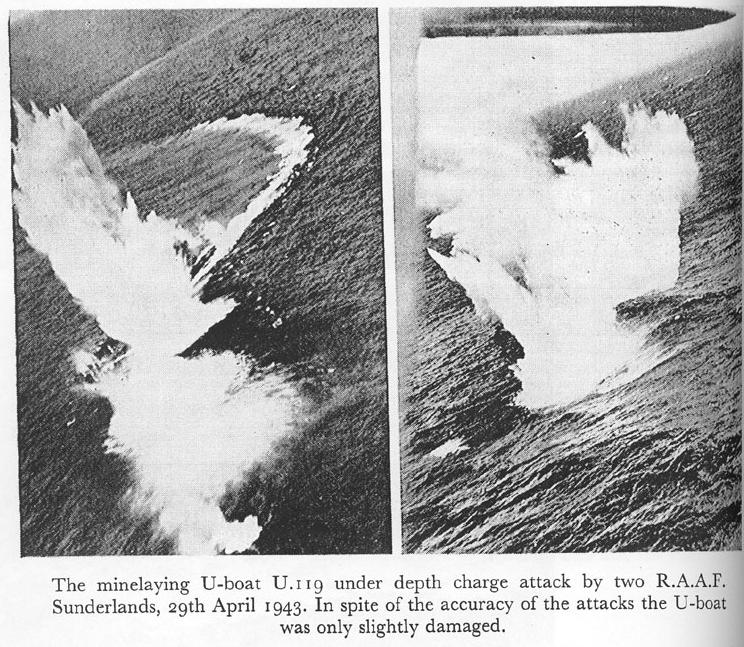
U-119 under attack

German submarine U-119 was a Type XB minelaying U-boat of Nazi Germany's Kriegsmarine during World War II. She was laid down at the Germaniawerft in Kiel on 15 May 1940 as yard number 624. She was launched on 6 January 1942 and commissioned under Kapitänleutnant Alois Zech on 2 April 1942, he was replaced by Kptlt. Horst-Tessen von Kameke on 15 April 1943, who remained in command until her loss.

U-119's service career began with the 4th U-boat Flotilla on 2 April 1942 where she underwent training. She was declared operational on 1 February 1943 when she moved over to the 12th flotilla.

== Operational career ==
The boat made a short run from Kiel to Frederikshaven in Denmark and back from 4 to 10 August 1942.

=== First patrol ===
Her first patrol commenced with her departure from Kiel on 6 February 1943. She crossed the North Sea and skirted the northern coast of Iceland, arriving at Bordeaux in occupied France on 1 April.

=== Second patrol and loss ===
U-119 was unsuccessfully attacked on 29 April 1943 by a Short Sunderland flying boat of 461 Squadron RAAF (Royal Australian Air Force). The boat sustained no damage but one man was killed.

She sank Halma on 3 June east of Halifax, Nova Scotia and damaged John A. Poor on 27 July. Both ships were attacked with mines laid by U-119 on 1 June.

U-119 was sunk by a combination of depth charges, gunfire and ramming from HMS Starling on 24 June 1943.

== Summary of raiding history ==
Date	Name	Nationality	Tonnage (GRT)	Fate
3 June 1943	Halma	Panama	2,937	Sunk (Mine)
28 July 1943	John A. Poor	United States	7,176	Damaged (Mine)

== Bibliography ==
- Busch, Rainer; Röll, Hans-Joachim (1999). German U-boat commanders of World War II : a biographical dictionary. Translated by Brooks, Geoffrey. London, Annapolis, Md: Greenhill Books, Naval Institute Press. ISBN 1-55750-186-6.
- Busch, Rainer; Röll, Hans-Joachim (1999). Deutsche U-Boot-Verluste von September 1939 bis Mai 1945 [German U-boat losses from September 1939 to May 1945]. Der U-Boot-Krieg (in German). Vol. IV. Hamburg, Berlin, Bonn: Mittler. ISBN 3-8132-0514-2.
- Gröner, Erich; Jung, Dieter; Maass, Martin (1991). U-boats and Mine Warfare Vessels. German Warships 1815–1945. Vol. 2. Translated by Thomas, Keith; Magowan, Rachel. London: Conway Maritime Press. ISBN 0-85177-593-4.
- Kemp, Paul (1999). U-Boats Destroyed - German Submarine Losses in the World Wars. London: Arms & Armour. ISBN 1-85409-515-3.
