= German submarine U-117 (1941) =

German World War II submarine

Coordinates: 39°42′N 38°21′W

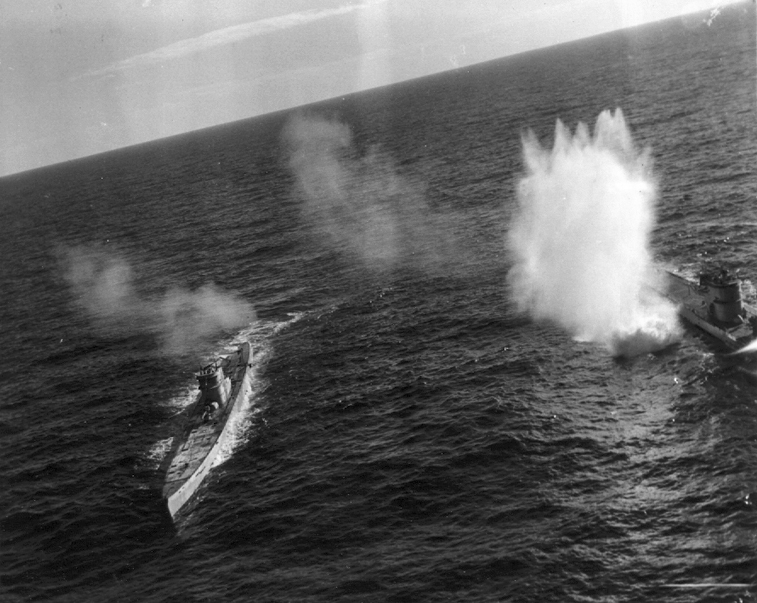
- U-117 (right) and U-66 under attack by aircraft from USS Card on 7 August 1943

History

Nazi Germany
- Name: U-117
- Ordered: 31 January 1939
- Builder: Germaniawerft, Kiel
- Yard number: 616
- Laid down: 1 July 1939
- Launched: 22 July 1941
- Commissioned: 25 October 1941
- Fate: Sunk on 7 August 1943

General characteristics
- Class & type: Type X submarine minelayer
- Displacement: 1,763 tonnes (1,735 long tons) surfaced; 2,177 tonnes (2,143 long tons) submerged
- Length: 89.80 m (294 ft 7 in) o/a; 70.90 m (232 ft 7 in) pressure hull
- Beam: 9.20 m (30 ft 2 in) o/a; 4.75 m (15 ft 7 in) pressure hull
- Height: 10.20 m (33 ft 6 in)
- Draught: 4.71 m (15 ft 5 in)
- Propulsion: 2 × supercharged GW F 46 a 9 pu 9-cylinder, four-stroke diesel engines, 4,800 PS (4,700 bhp; 3,500 kW); 2 × AEG GU 720/8-287 electric motors, 1,100 PS (1,100 shp; 810 kW)
- Speed: 16.4–17 knots (30.4–31.5 km/h; 18.9–19.6 mph) surfaced; 7 knots (13 km/h; 8.1 mph) submerged
- Range: 18,450 nautical miles (34,170 km; 21,230 mi) at 10 knots (19 km/h; 12 mph) surfaced; 93 nmi (172 km; 107 mi) at 4 knots (7.4 km/h; 4.6 mph) submerged
- Test depth: Calculated crush depth: 220 m (720 ft)
- Complement: 5 officers, 47 enlisted
- Armament: 2 × 53.3 cm (21 in) stern torpedo tubes; 15 × torpedoes; 66 × SMA mines; 1 × 10.5 cm (4.1 in) deck gun (200 rounds)

Service record
- Part of: 2nd U-boat Flotilla; 25 October 1941 - 31 January 1942; 1st U-boat Flotilla; 1 February - 14 October 1942; 11th U-boat Flotilla; 15 October - 30 November 1942; 12th U-boat Flotilla; 1 December 1942 - 7 August 1943
- Identification codes: M 45 207
- Commanders: F.Kapt. Hans-Werner Neumann; 25 October 1941 - 7 August 1943
- Operations: 5 patrols: 1st patrol: a. 19 September - 5 October 1942; b. 10–11 October 1942; 2nd patrol: 12 October - 22 November 1942; 3rd patrol: a. 23 December 1942 - 7 February 1943; b. 7–8 March 1943; 4th patrol: 31 March - 13 May 1943; 5th patrol: 22 July - 7 August 1943
- Victories: 1 merchant ship total loss (7,092 GRT); 1 merchant ship damaged (7,177 GRT)

German submarine U-117 was a Type XB minelaying U-boat of Nazi Germany's Kriegsmarine during World War II.

She was ordered on 31 January 1939, and laid down on 1 July 1939, at Friedrich Krupp Germaniawerft, Kiel, as yard number 616. She was launched on 22 July 1941 and commissioned under the command of Fregattenkapitän Hans-Werner Neumann on 25 October of that year.

== Service record ==
=== First patrol ===
On 19 September 1942, U-117 departed from Kiel and headed out into the North Atlantic. Her first patrol involved sailing along the coast of Norway and then in the direction of Iceland. Upon reaching the island, she headed for her new home port of Lorient in France. U-117 made no attacks nor was she attacked during her first patrol.

=== Second patrol ===
Like her first patrol, U-117's second foray resulted in no attacks on either merchant vessels or the U-boat itself. Following her departure from Königsberg in East Prussia (now Kaliningrad) on 12 October 1942, she traveled up to Iceland once again. Then she headed south into the Bay of Biscay, she reached Lorient on 22 November 1942.

=== Third patrol ===
Much like her last two patrols, U-117's third sortie resulted in no contact with any Allied vessels. She departed Lorient on 23 December 1942, and returned on 3 February 1943.

=== Fourth patrol ===
U-117s fourth patrol was the first and last time that any Allied vessels were hit by the submarine. Following her departure from Lorient on 31 March 1943, she headed out into the Mid-Atlantic, made a sharp turn upon reaching the Canary Islands and headed for French Morocco. It was in this region that she scored her only two successes of the war. On 11 April 1943, Matt W. Ransom was hit and damaged by a mine from U-117. On 25 April 1943, SS Empire Morn struck another mine and was badly damaged.

=== Fifth patrol and sinking ===
On 1 December 1942, U-117 was assigned to the 12th U-boat Flotilla at Bordeaux. Her fifth and final patrol began on 22 July 1943 from her base in Bordeaux. Her main objective on this patrol was to lay 66 mines off New York City. On 27 July, U-Boat Control directed U-117 to divert from her course to refuel U-66, which was also heading for North America. U-66 was attacked by aircraft on 3 August, before the rendezvous took place, and was in need of medical assistance. U-117 reached U-66 on 6 August and transferred her ship's doctor and other essentials to U-66.

The next day, Grumman TBF Avenger aircraft (VC-1 USN) from the escort carrier USS Card attacked the two U-boats on the surface while U-117 was refueling U-66. The Avengers dropped depth charges near U-117 and U-66. U-117 tried to help U-66 during the attack, but was attacked herself by a FIDO homing torpedo dropped by another Avenger. Two more Avengers and two F4F Wildcats arrived later from USS Card and forced U-117 to dive and then dropped depth charges. U-117 was hit by one of two FIDO homing torpedoes dropped by the Avengers and sank with the loss of all crew. U-66 was able to escape the Avengers during the attack and make her way back to her home port of Lorient.

== Summary of raiding history ==
Results
Date	Name	Flag	GRT	Notes
11 April 1943	Matt W. Ransom	United States	7,177	Damaged by mine
25 April 1943	Empire Morn	United Kingdom	7,092	Sunk by mine

== See also ==
- Battle of the Atlantic

== Bibliography ==
- Busch, Rainer; Röll, Hans-Joachim (1999). German U-boat commanders of World War II : a biographical dictionary. Translated by Brooks, Geoffrey. London, Annapolis, Md: Greenhill Books, Naval Institute Press. ISBN 1-55750-186-6.
- Busch, Rainer; Röll, Hans-Joachim (1999). Deutsche U-Boot-Verluste von September 1939 bis Mai 1945 [German U-boat losses from September 1939 to May 1945]. Der U-Boot-Krieg (in German). Vol. IV. Hamburg, Berlin, Bonn: Mittler. ISBN 3-8132-0514-2.
- Gröner, Erich; Jung, Dieter; Maass, Martin (1991). U-boats and Mine Warfare Vessels. German Warships 1815–1945. Vol. 2. Translated by Thomas, Keith; Magowan, Rachel. London: Conway Maritime Press. ISBN 0-85177-593-4.
- Kemp, Paul (1999). U-Boats Destroyed - German Submarine Losses in the World Wars. London: Arms & Armour. ISBN 1-85409-515-3.
- Blair, Clay (2000). Hitler's U-Boat War: The Hunted, 1942–1945 (Modern Library Paperback ed.). New York: Random House. ISBN 0-679-64033-9.
- Williamson, Gordon; Palmer, Ian (2002). Kriegsmarine U-boats 1939–45: Vol 2. Osprey. ISBN 1-84176-364-0.
