= German submarine U-220 =

German World War II submarine

History

Nazi Germany
- Name: U-220
- Ordered: 6 August 1940
- Builder: Germaniawerft, Kiel
- Yard number: 626
- Laid down: 16 June 1941
- Launched: 16 January 1943
- Commissioned: 27 March 1943
- Fate: Sunk by depth charges 28 October 1943

General characteristics
- Class & type: Type X submarine minelayer
- Displacement: 1,763 tonnes (1,735 long tons) surfaced; 2,177 tonnes (2,143 long tons) submerged
- Length: 89.80 m (294 ft 7 in) o/a; 70.90 m (232 ft 7 in) pressure hull
- Beam: 9.20 m (30 ft 2 in) o/a; 4.75 m (15 ft 7 in) pressure hull
- Height: 10.20 m (33 ft 6 in)
- Draught: 4.71 m (15 ft 5 in)
- Propulsion: 2 × supercharged GW F 46 a 9 pu 9 cylinder, four-stroke diesel engines, 4,800 PS (4,700 bhp; 3,500 kW); 2 × AEG GU 720/8-287 electric motors, 1,100 PS (1,100 shp; 810 kW)
- Speed: 16.4–17 knots (30.4–31.5 km/h; 18.9–19.6 mph) surfaced; 7 knots (13 km/h; 8.1 mph) submerged
- Range: 18,450 nautical miles (34,170 km; 21,230 mi) at 10 knots (19 km/h; 12 mph) surfaced; 93 nmi (172 km; 107 mi) at 4 knots (7.4 km/h; 4.6 mph) submerged
- Test depth: Calculated crush depth: 220 m (720 ft)
- Complement: 5 officers, 47 enlisted
- Armament: 2 × 53.3 cm (21 in) stern torpedo tubes; 15 × torpedoes; 66 × SMA mines; 1 × 10.5 cm (4.1 in) deck gun (200 rounds)

Service record
- Part of: 4th U-boat Flotilla; 27 March - 31 August 1943; 12th U-boat Flotilla; 1 September - 28 October 1943
- Identification codes: M 50 753
- Commanders: Oblt.z.S. Bruno Barber; 27 March - 28 October 1943
- Operations: 1 patrol: 8 September - 28 October 1943
- Victories: 2 merchant ships sunk (7,199 GRT)

German submarine U-220 was a Type XB submarine of Nazi Germany's Kriegsmarine during World War II.

The U-boat was laid down on 16 June 1941 at the Germaniawerft yard at Kiel as yard number 626, launched on 16 January 1943 and commissioned on 27 March 1943 under the command of Oberleutnant zur See Bruno Barber.

The boat's service career began with training in the 4th U-boat Flotilla followed by reassignment to the 12th flotilla for operations.

In one patrol, the submarine sank two ships.

The boat was sunk on 28 October 1943 by US aircraft in mid-Atlantic.

== Service history ==
=== Patrol and loss ===
Following a short journey from Kiel to Bergen in Norway, the submarine set out on patrol on 8 September 1943 through the gap between Iceland and the Faroe Islands, heading for the North American coast. Off St. Johns in Canada, she laid 66 magnetic mines on 9 October, one of which sank Delisle on the 19th. Also lost on the same day was Penolver. The master of Delisle was trapped on the sinking ship by his wooden leg. He was freed, rescued and taken to a hospital, minus his leg. He could not be released due to the wartime shortage of artificial limbs, but his original leg was found, washed up on a beach and recovered.

In between these events, two men were lost overboard on the 16th.

U-220 was sunk by depth charges dropped by Avenger and Wildcat aircraft from the carrier USS Block Island on 28 October 1943. Fifty-six men died; there were no survivors.

== Summary of raiding history ==
Date	Name	Nationality	Tonnage (GRT)	Fate
19 October 1943	Delisle	United States	3,478	Sunk (Mine)
19 October 1943	Penolver	United Kingdom	3,721	Sunk (Mine)

== Bibliography ==
- Busch, Rainer; Röll, Hans-Joachim (1999). German U-boat commanders of World War II : a biographical dictionary. Translated by Brooks, Geoffrey. London, Annapolis, Md: Greenhill Books, Naval Institute Press. ISBN 1-55750-186-6.
- Gröner, Erich; Jung, Dieter; Maass, Martin (1991). U-boats and Mine Warfare Vessels. German Warships 1815–1945. Vol. 2. Translated by Thomas, Keith; Magowan, Rachel. London: Conway Maritime Press. ISBN 0-85177-593-4.
