= German submarine U-116 (1941) =

German World War II submarine

History

Nazi Germany
- Name: U-116
- Ordered: 31 January 1939
- Builder: Germaniawerft, Kiel
- Yard number: 615
- Laid down: 1 July 1939
- Launched: 3 May 1941
- Commissioned: 26 July 1941
- Fate: Missing since 6 October 1942 in the North Atlantic

General characteristics
- Class & type: Type X submarine minelayer
- Displacement: 1,763 tonnes (1,735 long tons) surfaced; 2,177 tonnes (2,143 long tons) submerged
- Length: 89.80 m (294 ft 7 in) o/a; 70.90 m (232 ft 7 in) pressure hull
- Beam: 9.20 m (30 ft 2 in) o/a; 4.75 m (15 ft 7 in) pressure hull
- Height: 10.20 m (33 ft 6 in)
- Draught: 4.71 m (15 ft 5 in)
- Propulsion: 2 × supercharged GW F 46 a 9 pu 9 cylinder, four-stroke diesel engines, 4,800 PS (4,700 bhp; 3,500 kW); 2 × AEG GU 720/8-287 electric motors, 1,100 PS (1,100 shp; 810 kW)
- Speed: 16.4–17 knots (30.4–31.5 km/h; 18.9–19.6 mph) surfaced; 7 knots (13 km/h; 8.1 mph) submerged
- Range: 18,450 nautical miles (34,170 km; 21,230 mi) at 10 knots (19 km/h; 12 mph) surfaced; 93 nmi (172 km; 107 mi) at 4 knots (7.4 km/h; 4.6 mph) submerged
- Test depth: Calculated crush depth: 220 m (720 ft)
- Complement: 5 officers, 47 enlisted
- Armament: 2 × 53.3 cm (21 in) stern torpedo tubes; 15 × torpedoes; 66 × SMA mines; 1 × 10.5 cm (4.1 in) deck gun (200 rounds); various AA guns

Service record
- Part of: 2nd U-boat Flotilla; 26 July 1941 - 31 January 1942; 1st U-boat Flotilla; 1 February - 6 October 1942
- Identification codes: M 43 288
- Commanders: K.Kapt. Werner von Schmidt; 26 July 1941 - 10 September 1942; Oblt.z.S. Wilhelm Grimme; 11 September - 6 October 1942
- Operations: 4 patrols: 1st patrol: 25 April - 5 May 1942; 2nd patrol: 16 May - 9 June 1942; 3rd patrol: 27 June - 23 August 1942; 4th patrol: 22 September - 6 October 1942
- Victories: 1 merchant ship sunk (4,284 GRT); 1 merchant ship damaged (7,093 GRT)

German submarine U-116 was a Type XB minelaying U-boat of Nazi Germany's Kriegsmarine during World War II.

She was ordered on 31 January 1939 and laid down on 1 July at Friedrich Krupp Germaniawerft, Kiel, as yard number 615. She was launched on 3 May 1941 and commissioned under the command of Korvettenkapitän Werner von Schmidt on 26 July of that year.

== Service history ==
=== 1st patrol ===
After a period of training as part of the 2nd U-boat Flotilla, U-116 was assigned to the front-line as part of the 1st U-boat Flotilla on 1 February 1942. She sailed from Kiel on 4 April 1942, bound for Bergen, Norway, via Heligoland, and departed Bergen on 25 April, circling the British Isles before arriving at Lorient in occupied France, on 5 May.

=== 2nd patrol ===
U-116 sailed from Lorient on 16 May 1942 on a patrol to the mid-Atlantic lasting 25 days, arriving back at her homeport on 9 June, without any success.

=== 3rd patrol ===
U-116 was more successful on her third patrol which took her south to the coast of West Africa, attacking Convoy OS-33 south of the Azores on 12 July 1942. Soon after midnight she fired one torpedo at the 7,093 GRT merchant ship Cortona, causing some damage; although the ship was then sunk by U-201. Nine hours later U-116 fired two torpedoes into the 4,284 GRT British merchant ship Shaftesbury, which sank in 15 minutes. The U-boat returned to Lorient on 23 August, after 58 days at sea.

=== 4th patrol ===
For her fourth patrol, U-116 sailed under the command of Oberleutnant zur See Wilhelm Grimme. Leaving Lorient on 22 September 1942, she sent her last radio message on 6 October whilst in the North Atlantic at position 45°00′N 31°30′W, and was never heard from again. 56 men were lost with her.

== Summary of raiding history ==
Date	Name	Nationality	Tonnage (GRT)	Fate
12 July 1942	Cortona	United Kingdom	7,093	Damaged
12 July 1942	Shaftesbury	United Kingdom	4,284	Sunk

== Bibliography ==
- Busch, Rainer; Röll, Hans-Joachim (1999). German U-boat commanders of World War II : a biographical dictionary. Translated by Brooks, Geoffrey. London, Annapolis, Md: Greenhill Books, Naval Institute Press. ISBN 1-55750-186-6.
- Busch, Rainer; Röll, Hans-Joachim (1999). Deutsche U-Boot-Verluste von September 1939 bis Mai 1945 [German U-boat losses from September 1939 to May 1945]. Der U-Boot-Krieg (in German). Vol. IV. Hamburg, Berlin, Bonn: Mittler. ISBN 3-8132-0514-2.
- Gröner, Erich; Jung, Dieter; Maass, Martin (1991). U-boats and Mine Warfare Vessels. German Warships 1815–1945. Vol. 2. Translated by Thomas, Keith; Magowan, Rachel. London: Conway Maritime Press. ISBN 0-85177-593-4.
- Kemp, Paul (1999). U-Boats Destroyed - German Submarine Losses in the World Wars. London: Arms & Armour. ISBN 1-85409-515-3.
