= German submarine U-871 =

German World War II submarine

History

Nazi Germany
- Name: U-871
- Ordered: 25 August 1941
- Builder: DeSchiMAG AG Weser, Bremen
- Yard number: 1079
- Laid down: 14 November 1942
- Launched: 7 September 1943
- Commissioned: 15 January 1944
- Fate: Sunk on 26 September 1944

General characteristics
- Class & type: Type IXD2 submarine
- Displacement: 1,610 t (1,580 long tons) surfaced; 1,799 t (1,771 long tons) submerged
- Length: 87.58 m (287 ft 4 in) o/a; 68.50 m (224 ft 9 in) pressure hull
- Beam: 7.50 m (24 ft 7 in) o/a; 4.40 m (14 ft 5 in) pressure hull
- Height: 10.20 m (33 ft 6 in)
- Draught: 5.35 m (17 ft 7 in)
- Installed power: 9,000 PS (6,620 kW; 8,880 bhp) (diesels); 1,000 PS (740 kW; 990 shp) (electric)
- Propulsion: 2 shafts; 2 × diesel engines; 2 × electric motors
- Speed: 20.8 knots (38.5 km/h; 23.9 mph) surfaced; 6.9 knots (12.8 km/h; 7.9 mph) submerged
- Range: 12,750 nmi (23,610 km; 14,670 mi) at 10 knots (19 km/h; 12 mph) surfaced; 57 nmi (106 km; 66 mi) at 4 knots (7.4 km/h; 4.6 mph) submerged
- Test depth: 230 m (750 ft)
- Complement: 66
- Armament: 6 × 53.3 cm (21 in) torpedo tubes (four bow, two stern); 24 × torpedoes or 48 TMA or 72 TMB naval mines; 1 × 3.7 cm (1.5 in) Flak M42 AA gun; 2 × 2 cm (0.79 in) C/30 anti-aircraft guns

Service record
- Part of: 4th U-boat Flotilla; 15 January – 31 July 1944; 12th U-boat Flotilla; 1 August – 26 September 1944
- Identification codes: M 19 451
- Commanders: Kptlt. Erwin Ganzer; 15 January – 26 September 1944
- Operations: 1 patrol: 31 August – 26 September 1944
- Victories: None

German submarine U-871 was a long-range Type IXD2 U-boat built for Nazi Germany's Kriegsmarine during World War II.

She was ordered on 25 August 1941, and was laid down on 14 November 1942 at DeSchiMAG AG Weser, Bremen, as yard number 1079. She was launched on 7 September 1943 and commissioned under the command of Kapitänleutnant Erwin Ganzer on 15 January 1944.

== Design ==
German Type IXD2 submarines were considerably larger than the original Type IXs. U-871 had a displacement of 1,610 tonnes (1,580 long tons) when at the surface and 1,799 tonnes (1,771 long tons) while submerged. The U-boat had a total length of 87.58 m (287 ft 4 in), a pressure hull length of 68.50 m (224 ft 9 in), a beam of 7.50 m (24 ft 7 in), a height of 10.20 m (33 ft 6 in), and a draught of 5.35 m (17 ft 7 in). The submarine was powered by two MAN M 9 V 40/46 supercharged four-stroke, nine-cylinder diesel engines plus two MWM RS34.5S six-cylinder four-stroke diesel engines for cruising, producing a total of 9,000 metric horsepower (6,620 kW; 8,880 shp) for use while surfaced, two Siemens-Schuckert 2 GU 345/34 double-acting electric motors producing a total of 1,000 shaft horsepower (1,010 PS; 750 kW) for use while submerged. She had two shafts and two 1.85 m (6 ft) propellers. The boat was capable of operating at depths of up to 200 metres (660 ft).

The submarine had a maximum surface speed of 20.8 knots (38.5 km/h; 23.9 mph) and a maximum submerged speed of 6.9 knots (12.8 km/h; 7.9 mph). When submerged, the boat could operate for 121 nautical miles (224 km; 139 mi) at 2 knots (3.7 km/h; 2.3 mph); when surfaced, she could travel 12,750 nautical miles (23,610 km; 14,670 mi) at 10 knots (19 km/h; 12 mph). U-871 was fitted with six 53.3 cm (21 in) torpedo tubes (four fitted at the bow and two at the stern), 24 torpedoes, and a 3.7 cm (1.5 in) Flak M42 with 2575 rounds as well as two 2 cm (0.79 in) C/30 anti-aircraft guns with 8100 rounds. The boat had a complement of fifty-five.

== Service history ==
On 26 September 1944, U-871 was sunk by depth charges northwest of the Azores, by a British B-17 Flying Fortress of 220 Squadron/P RAF. All 69 of her crew were lost.

The wreck lies at 43°18′N 36°28′W.

== Bibliography ==
- Busch, Rainer; Röll, Hans-Joachim (1997). Der U-Boot-Krieg, 1939-1945: Der U-Boot Bau auf deutschen Werften (in German). Vol. II. Hamburg, Berlin, Bonn: Mittler. ISBN 3-8132-0509-6.
- Busch, Rainer; Röll, Hans-Joachim (1999). German U-boat commanders of World War II : a biographical dictionary. Translated by Brooks, Geoffrey. London, Annapolis, Md: Greenhill Books, Naval Institute Press. ISBN 1-55750-186-6.
- Busch, Rainer; Röll, Hans-Joachim (1999). Der U-Boot-Krieg, 1939-1945: Deutsche U-Boot-Verluste von September 1939 bis Mai 1945 [German U-boat losses from September 1939 to May 1945] (in German). Vol. IV. Hamburg, Berlin, Bonn: Mittler. ISBN 3-8132-0514-2.
- Gröner, Eric; Jung, Dieter; Maass, Martin (1991). German Warships 1815-1945: U-boats and Mine Warfare Vessels. Vol. 2. Translated by Thomas, Keith; Magowan, Rachel. London: Conway Maritime Press. ISBN 0-85177-593-4.
- Sharpe, Peter (1998). U-Boat Fact File, 1935-1945. Great Britain: Midland Publishing. ISBN 1-85780-072-9.
