= German submarine U-195 =

German World War II submarine

History

Nazi Germany
- Name: U-195
- Ordered: 4 November 1940
- Builder: DeSchiMAG AG Weser, Bremen
- Yard number: 1041
- Laid down: 15 May 1941
- Launched: 8 April 1942
- Commissioned: 5 September 1942
- Fate: Taken over by Japan on 5 May 1945

Japan
- Name: I-506
- Acquired: 5 May 1945
- Commissioned: 15 July 1945
- Fate: Surrendered in August 1945; Scuttled on 15 February 1946; Refloated and scrapped in 1947

General characteristics
- Class & type: Type IXD1 submarine
- Displacement: 1,610 t (1,580 long tons) surfaced; 1,799 t (1,771 long tons) submerged
- Length: 87.60 m (287 ft 5 in) o/a; 68.50 m (224 ft 9 in) pressure hull
- Beam: 7.50 m (24 ft 7 in) o/a; 4.40 m (14 ft 5 in) pressure hull
- Height: 10.20 m (33 ft 6 in)
- Draught: 5.40 m (17 ft 9 in)
- Installed power: 9,000 PS (6,620 kW; 8,880 bhp) (diesels); 1,000 PS (740 kW; 990 shp) (electric)
- Propulsion: 2 shafts; 2 × diesel engines; 2 × electric motors
- Speed: 20.8 knots (38.5 km/h; 23.9 mph) surfaced; 6.9 knots (12.8 km/h; 7.9 mph) submerged
- Range: 12,750 nmi (23,610 km; 14,670 mi) at 10 knots (19 km/h; 12 mph) surfaced; 213 nmi (394 km; 245 mi) at 4 knots (7.4 km/h; 4.6 mph) submerged
- Test depth: 230 m (750 ft)
- Complement: 55 to 63
- Armament: 6 × torpedo tubes (four bow, two stern); 22 × 53.3 cm (21 in) torpedoes; 1 × 10.5 cm (4.13 in) SK C/32 naval gun (150 rounds); 1 × 3.7 cm (1.5 in) SK C/30 AA gun; 2 × 2 cm (0.79 in) C/30 anti-aircraft guns

Service record (Kriegsmarine)
- Part of: 4th U-boat Flotilla; 5 September 1942 – 31 March 1943; 12th U-boat Flotilla; 1 April – 1 September 1943; 1 May – 30 September 1944; 33rd U-boat Flotilla; 1 October 1944 – 5 May 1945
- Identification codes: M 49 317
- Commanders: K.Kapt. Heinz Buchholz; 5 September 1942 – 17 October 1943; Oblt.z.S. Friedrich Steinfeldt; 16 April 1944 – 5 May 1945
- Operations: 3 patrols: 1st patrol: 20 March – 23 July 1943; 2nd patrol: 24 August – 28 December 1944; 3rd patrol: a. 19 January – 4 March 1945; b. 5 – 7 March 1945
- Victories: 2 merchant ships sunk (14,391 GRT); 1 merchant ship damaged (6,797 GRT)

Service record (IJN)
- Part of: 2nd Southern Expeditionary Fleet; 15 July – August 1945
- Commanders: None
- Operations: None
- Victories: None

German submarine U-195 was a Type IXD1 transport U-boat which served in World War II. The submarine was laid down on 15 May 1941 at the DeSchiMAG AG Weser yard in Bremen as yard number 1041, launched on 8 April 1942, and commissioned on 5 September 1942 under the command of Korvettenkapitän Heinz Buchholz.

U-195 was one of two IX-D1 transport U-boats that had their forward torpedo tubes removed and the compartment converted into a cargo hold. The other IX-D1 was U-180, which was lost in the Bay of Biscay in 1944 whilst setting out for a voyage to Japan. (U-180 had been trialled originally with six diesel engines driving two propeller shafts, but overheating proved such a problem that these engines were removed and replaced with a pair of 2,200 hp MAN diesel engines). It is unclear if U-195 underwent the same engine history as U-180, but it seems likely.

== Design ==
German Type IXD2 submarines were considerably larger than the original Type IXs. U-195 had a displacement of 1,610 tonnes (1,580 long tons) when at the surface and 1,799 tonnes (1,771 long tons) while submerged. The U-boat had a total length of 87.58 m (287 ft 4 in), a pressure hull length of 68.50 m (224 ft 9 in), a beam of 7.50 m (24 ft 7 in), a height of 10.20 m (33 ft 6 in), and a draught of 5.35 m (17 ft 7 in). The submarine was powered by two MAN M 9 V 40/46 supercharged four-stroke, nine-cylinder diesel engines plus two MWM RS34.5S six-cylinder four-stroke diesel engines for cruising, producing a total of 9,000 metric horsepower (6,620 kW; 8,880 shp) for use while surfaced, two Siemens-Schuckert 2 GU 345/34 double-acting electric motors producing a total of 1,000 shaft horsepower (1,010 PS; 750 kW) for use while submerged. She had two shafts and two 1.85 m (6 ft) propellers. The boat was capable of operating at depths of up to 200 metres (660 ft).

The submarine had a maximum surface speed of 20.8 knots (38.5 km/h; 23.9 mph) and a maximum submerged speed of 6.9 knots (12.8 km/h; 7.9 mph). When submerged, the boat could operate for 121 nautical miles (224 km; 139 mi) at 2 knots (3.7 km/h; 2.3 mph); when surfaced, she could travel 12,750 nautical miles (23,610 km; 14,670 mi) at 10 knots (19 km/h; 12 mph). U-195 was fitted with six 53.3 cm (21 in) torpedo tubes (four fitted at the bow and two at the stern), 24 torpedoes, one 10.5 cm (4.13 in) SK C/32 naval gun, 150 rounds, and a 3.7 cm (1.5 in) SK C/30 with 2575 rounds as well as two 2 cm (0.79 in) C/30 anti-aircraft guns with 8100 rounds. The boat had a complement of fifty-five.

== Operational history ==
=== First patrol ===
U-195 departed Kiel on 20 March 1943 and sailed to the waters off South Africa where she sank two ships and damaged another.

On 11 April she torpedoed the American 7,200 GRT liberty ship SS James W. Denver about 475 nmi (880 km; 547 mi) west of Las Palmas, Canary Islands. The ship, a straggler from Convoy UGS-7 en route from Baltimore to Casablanca, was loaded with sugar, acid, flour, aircraft parts, vehicles, bulldozers and had twelve P-38 Lightning aircraft as deck cargo. The crew of 69 abandoned ship in five lifeboats. The U-boat then fired two more torpedoes which sank the vessel.

Another unescorted liberty ship, Samuel Jordan Kirkwood was torpedoed on 7 May about 125 nmi (232 km; 144 mi) southeast of Ascension Island. The crew of 71 abandoned ship in four lifeboats and a raft before the U-boat sank the ship with another torpedo.

On 12 May, the unescorted 6,797 GRT American merchant ship Cape Neddick was hit by two torpedoes. One failed to explode, while the other tore a hole 25 ft (7.6 m) by 30 ft (9.1 m) in the side. Still under way, the ship's armed guards opened fire at the U-boat with their 4 in (100 mm), 3 in (76 mm), and 20 mm guns. The vessel began to sink, and most of the crew abandoned ship in two lifeboats and three rafts. After more than an hour the master and six volunteers re-boarded the ship and got her under way, just as U-195 fired another torpedo, which missed. The next day, the ship returned to pick up the men in the boats and rafts, and on 16 May arrived safely at Walvis Bay, South Africa. U-195 arrived at Bordeaux on 23 July after a patrol lasting 126 days.

=== Second patrol ===
Now under the command of Oblt.z.S. Friedrich Steinfeldt, U-195 left Bordeaux in occupied France on 24 August 1944 and arrived at Batavia (now part of Indonesia), 127 days later on 28 December.

Amongst her cargo were parts of 12 dismantled V-2 rockets for the Japanese military. U-219 also carried part of the same V-2 rocket consignment. Both U-boats arrived at Batavia in December 1944. These two U-boats are also thought to have carried Uranium oxide requested for Japan's atomic bomb project by General Toranouke Kawashima in July 1943. The signals requesting Uranium were part of the PURPLE decrypts which have since been declassified by the United States. U-195 head north to Brunei in order to refuel for the next journey.

=== Third patrol ===
U-195's final patrol involved an abortive attempt by several U-boats to sail back to Europe. Leaving Batavia on 19 January 1945 she sailed out into the Indian Ocean, south of Madagascar. There she refuelled U-boats of the Monsun Gruppe and then returned to Batavia on 4 March.

=== Imperial Japanese Navy ===
After Germany's surrender in early May 1945, U-195 was taken over by the Imperial Japanese Navy and was commissioned as I-506 on 15 July. The U-boat surrendered to the Allies at Batavia in August 1945, she was scuttled on 15 February 1946 and was broken up in 1947. Some members of the German crew were apprehended by Dutch military forces in Malang (East-Java) on 1 August 1947

== Summary of raiding history ==
Date	Name	Nationality	Tonnage (GRT)	Fate
11 April 1943	James W. Denver	United States	7,200	Sunk
7 May 1943	Samuel Jordan Kirkwood	United States	7,191	Sunk
12 May 1943	Cape Neddick	United States	6,797	Damaged

== Bibliography ==
- Busch, Rainer; Röll, Hans-Joachim (1999). German U-boat commanders of World War II : a biographical dictionary. Translated by Brooks, Geoffrey. London, Annapolis, Md: Greenhill Books, Naval Institute Press. ISBN 1-55750-186-6.
- Busch, Rainer; Röll, Hans-Joachim (1999). Deutsche U-Boot-Verluste von September 1939 bis Mai 1945 [German U-boat losses from September 1939 to May 1945]. Der U-Boot-Krieg (in German). Vol. IV. Hamburg, Berlin, Bonn: Mittler. ISBN 3-8132-0514-2.
- Gröner, Erich; Jung, Dieter; Maass, Martin (1991). U-boats and Mine Warfare Vessels. German Warships 1815–1945. Vol. 2. Translated by Thomas, Keith; Magowan, Rachel. London: Conway Maritime Press. ISBN 0-85177-593-4.
