= German submarine U-219 =

German World War II submarine

History

Nazi Germany
- Name: U-219
- Ordered: 6 August 1940
- Builder: Germaniawerft, Kiel
- Yard number: 625
- Laid down: 31 May 1941
- Launched: 6 October 1942
- Commissioned: 12 December 1942
- Fate: Seized by Imperial Japanese Navy at Jakarta, 5 May 1945

Empire of Japan
- Name: I-505
- Commissioned: 15 July 1945
- Captured: Empire of Japan, 5 May 1945
- Fate: Surrendered at Jakarta, August 1945; sunk, 3 February 1946

General characteristics
- Class & type: Type X submarine minelayer (converted to auxiliary transport submarine and tanker in 1944)
- Displacement: 1,763 tonnes (1,735 long tons) surfaced; 2,177 tonnes (2,143 long tons) submerged
- Length: 89.80 m (294 ft 7 in) o/a; 70.90 m (232 ft 7 in) pressure hull
- Beam: 9.20 m (30 ft 2 in) o/a; 4.75 m (15 ft 7 in) pressure hull
- Height: 10.20 m (33 ft 6 in)
- Draught: 4.71 m (15 ft 5 in)
- Propulsion: 2 × supercharged GW F 46 a 9 pu 9 cylinder, four-stroke diesel engines, 4,800 PS (4,700 bhp; 3,500 kW); 2 × AEG GU 720/8-287 electric motors, 1,100 PS (1,100 shp; 810 kW)
- Speed: 16.4–17 knots (30.4–31.5 km/h; 18.9–19.6 mph) surfaced; 7 knots (13 km/h; 8.1 mph) submerged
- Range: 18,450 nautical miles (34,170 km; 21,230 mi) at 10 knots (19 km/h; 12 mph) surfaced; 93 nmi (172 km; 107 mi) at 4 knots (7.4 km/h; 4.6 mph) submerged
- Test depth: Calculated crush depth: 220 m (720 ft)
- Complement: 5 officers, 47 enlisted
- Armament: 2 × 53.3 cm (21 in) stern torpedo tubes; 15 × torpedoes; 66 × SMA mines; 1 × 10.5 cm (4.1 in) deck gun (200 rounds)

Service record (Kriegsmarine)
- Part of: 4th U-boat Flotilla; 12 December 1942 - 30 June 1943; 12th U-boat Flotilla; 1 July 1943 - 30 September 1944; 33rd U-boat Flotilla; 1 October 1944 - 5 May 1945
- Identification codes: M 49 090
- Commanders: K.Kapt. Walter Burghagen; 12 December 1942 - 5 May 1945
- Operations: 2 patrols: 1st patrol: 22 October 1943 - 1 January 1944; 2nd patrol: 23 August - 11 December 1944
- Victories: None

Service record (IJN)
- Part of: 2nd Southern Expeditionary Fleet; 15 July – August 1945
- Commanders: None
- Operations: None
- Victories: None

German submarine U-219 was a Type XB submarine of Nazi Germany's Kriegsmarine during World War II. The U-boat was laid down on 31 May 1941 at the Germaniawerft yard at Kiel as yard number 625, launched on 6 October 1942, and commissioned on 12 December 1942 under the command of Korvettenkapitän Walter Burghagen.

Initially built as one of eight submarine minelayers, after her first patrol she was converted into a transport and tanker submarine, before being used as a blockade runner to deliver supplies to the German naval squadron operating in the Indian and Pacific Oceans. Upon arriving in Indonesia in December 1944, U-219 remained there for several months because of several mechanical problems, with its return trip to Germany with war materials being delayed. In May 1945 she was given by its crew to the Japanese after Germany's surrender, and was commissioned into the Imperial Japanese Navy as I-505 on 15 July 1945. She was never assigned a Japanese crew and was captured by the British after Japan's surrender, being sunk in February 1946 by the Royal Navy along with several other captured U-boats.

== Design ==
The Type XB submarine was designed in 1938 to serve as a minelayer. Weighing at 2,710 tons when submerged and fully loaded, it was the largest class of U-boats ever built, and therefore had reduced maneuverability and agility. The Type XB could carry 66 Schachtmine A mines in 30 mine shafts, with several in the forward hull and several in saddle tanks on each side of the submarine. When the submarine was used for cargo duty, the mine shafts could be used to carry freight containers.

== Kriegsmarine ==
The U-boat was laid down on 31 May 1941 at the Germaniawerft yard at Kiel as yard number 625, launched on 6 October 1942, and commissioned on 12 December 1942 under the command of Korvettenkapitän Walter Burghagen. On the same day, she was assigned to the 4th U-boat Flotilla for training. On 1 July 1943, she was reassigned to the 12th U-boat Flotilla based in Bordeaux, France.

=== First patrol ===
U-219 left Bordeaux on 5 October 1943 and traveled to Kristiansund, Norway, arriving on there on 7 October, and staying for less than a day before proceeding to Bergen, where she arrived on 9 October. She was initially supposed to carry out a minelaying patrol in the North Atlantic, but this plan was cancelled. From there, U-219 departed Bergen with orders to join the Monsun Gruppe in the Indian Ocean and lay mines west of Cape Town and Colombo, Ceylon. She ventured to the South Atlantic by first rounding the British Isles and heading south, west of Ireland, to meet with the second squadron of Monsun Gruppe U-boats on their way to the Indian Ocean.

Although U-219's mission had been to lay mines off Cape Town and Colombo, when the group's U-tanker ("Milk Cow") was destroyed, U-219 was required to take its place, refueling the other submarines of the group at sea (including U-170, U-172 and U-510). Of this group, only U-510 continued to Penang, Japanese-occupied Malaysia.

Her orders were then changed and she was told to return to Bordeaux. While U-219 was resupplying U-172 southwest of the Canary Islands on 12 December 1943, the U.S. Tenth Fleet (a "paper fleet" in charge of anti-submarine warfare coordination) learned of their presence by decoding the orders to U-219 from U-boat Command, and sent two Grumman TBF Avenger torpedo bombers from the escort carrier USS Bogue to their location. U-172 was eventually sunk by the aircraft and the escort carrier's destroyers after a 24-hour chase, and U-219 used that as an opportunity to escape from them. She returned to Bordeaux on 1 January 1944. After her return, U-219 underwent modifications to convert her permanently to a transport submarine (she and U-488 were the only two remaining Milk Cows at Bordeaux, in addition to two more in German waters). She was also given a snorkel device. and a new lavatory.

=== Second patrol ===
After her return, she was prepared to serve as a blockade runner to deliver supplies to the Monsun Gruppe in the Far East. U-219 was outfitted with cargo instead of mines. It took three or four months to complete her outfitting and planning for the operation, and the Allied invasion of southern France in the summer of 1944 meant that the submarine base at Bordeaux came under aerial bombings, but the U-boats remained undamaged. She underwent several trials between April and May to test her with the new fully loaded cargo, with 12th U-boat Flotilla engineers being aboard. In the first test, the fully loaded U-219 began sinking quickly during a dive, but the engineers stabilized it. After the test they decided to reduce the weight, such as by removing her anti-aircraft gun and ammunition. She still carried some torpedoes, so as not to be completely defenseless.

On her next voyage east, U-219 departed Bordeaux on 23 August 1944 with U-195 and U-180, two other converted transport submarines. Sources differ on her cargo. According to one source, she was carrying two Japanese officers, and freight which included uranium oxide, blueprints for advanced weapons and part of a consignment of twelve dismantled V-2 rockets for Japan shared with U-195. Another source says there were no foreign passengers or parts for an atomic bomb, but that she was only carrying machine parts, torpedo parts, medical supplies, spare parts for a seaplane at the Penang base, mercury, aluminum, and optical equipment. After leaving Bordeaux, she met up with U-195 and U-180 and they proceeded on their journey.

As U-219 was on its way, it was ordered by U-boat Command to meet up with U-1062, on its way back to Europe from Penang after delivering supplies to the Monsun Gruppe and running low on fuel, southwest of the Cape Verde Islands. The message from command to U-219's commanding officer, Burghagen, with the coordinates for the rendezvous point with U-1062 was intercepted by Allied intelligence. The carrier groups of USS Tripoli and USS Mission Bay were alerted to the presence of the submarines and deployed air patrols to search the area. As U-219 was waiting for U-1062, it was attacked five times by three Grumman Avengers from Tripoli on 28 September 1944.

Burghagen ordered the boat to dive after shooting down one of the planes with the boat's anti-aircraft gun, and they remained underwater, managing to evade the sonobuoys that were dropped by the aircraft. U-1062 was sunk with all hands on 30 September, as Burghagen continued waiting. He found a salinity layer in which the boat could drift while using a minimal level of its battery, and remained submerged for nearly 70 hours. The air quality became so bad that they had to return to the surface on 4 October as members of the crew became sick. Burghagen decided to abandon the rendezvous and proceeded to Penang, and avoided another aerial attack on 30 October 1944 off South Africa. It was the final attack on U-219 during the trip. She was redirected by U-boat Command from Penang to Batavia instead because of the frequent Allied attacks on the Penang base. U-219 reported firing torpedoes at a target and heard an explosion, but did not sink any ships. She arrived in Batavia on 12 December 1944, along with U-195.

=== In Southeast Asia ===
U-219 spent the next several months from December 1944 until the German surrender in May 1945 between Japanese-occupied Indonesia and Singapore. She was slightly damaged in an incident on 26 December, when the Japanese ammunition transport ship Taicho Maru exploded near her and several other U-boats. U-219 suffered from technical problems that delayed its planned departure back to Germany with a cargo of war materials, and in April 1945 she was ordered to remain where she was by U-boat Command. On 5 May 1945, the crew was interned by the Japanese as they were informed by the German naval attaché in Japan, Admiral Paul Wenneker, as well as the commander of the U-boat base in Penang, Hermann Kandeler, that Germany surrendered and ceased all hostilities with the Allies.

== Imperial Japanese Navy ==
Following Germany's surrender, U-219 was seized by the Japanese at Batavia on 5 May 1945 and on 15 July it was placed into service with the Imperial Japanese Navy as I-505. No Japanese crew was assigned to I-505 because the Southern Expeditionary Fleet lacked trained submarine personnel. Some crewmen were being trained for service aboard I-505 by early August 1945 but this was not completed. The German crew remained at the base in Indonesia and later were taken as prisoners of war by the British. Eventually I-505 was captured at Surabaya in September 1945 by the Royal Navy and sunk on 3 February 1946 by gunfire and depth charges from the Dutch destroyer HNLMS Kortenaer, at 06°31′00″S 104°54′08″E off the Sunda Strait. The Tripartite Naval Commission had ordered the Royal Navy's Eastern Fleet commander-in-chief, Vice Admiral Clement Moody, to sink the four German U-boats that were captured in Indonesia.

== After the war ==
The former executive officer of U-219 during its mission to the Far East, Hans-Joachim Krug, later served as a consultant for the German war film Das Boot.

== Bibliography ==
- Beasant, John (1999). Stalin's Silver: The Sinking of the USS John Barry. St. Martin's Press. ISBN 978-0-312-20590-4.
- Busch, Rainer; Röll, Hans-Joachim (1999). German U-boat commanders of World War II : a biographical dictionary. Translated by Brooks, Geoffrey. London, Annapolis, Md: Greenhill Books, Naval Institute Press. ISBN 1-55750-186-6.
- Gröner, Erich; Jung, Dieter; Maass, Martin (1991). U-boats and Mine Warfare Vessels. German Warships 1815–1945. Vol. 2. Translated by Thomas, Keith; Magowan, Rachel. London: Conway Maritime Press. ISBN 0-85177-593-4.
- Krug, Hans-Joachim; Hirama, Yoichi; Niestl, Axel (2001). Reluctant Allies: German–Japanese Naval Relations in World War II. Naval Institute Press. ISBN 978-1557504654.
- Stevens, David (1997). U-boat Far from Home, The Epic Voyage of U-862 to Australia and New Zealand. Allen & Unwin. ISBN 978-1-86448-267-6.
- White, John (2009). The Milk Cows: The U-boat Tankers, 1941–1945. London: Pen and Sword Books. ISBN 978-1844682614.
