= 12th U-boat Flotilla =

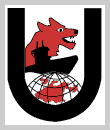
- 12th Flotilla emblem
- Active: 1941–1944
- Country: Nazi Germany
- Branch: Kriegsmarine
- Type: U-boat flotilla
- Garrison/HQ: Bordeaux, Occupied France
- Engagements: World War II

Commanders
- Notable commanders: Fregattenkapitän Klaus Scholtz

The 12th U-boat Flotilla (German 12. Unterseebootsflottille) was a German U-boat flotilla formed on 15 October 1942 at Bordeaux under the command of Korvettenkapitän Klaus Scholtz. The flotilla was disbanded on 25 August 1944 due to the imminent arrival of Allied forces.

== Flotilla commanders ==
Duration	Commander
January 1941 – January 1944	Fregattenkapitän Klaus Scholtz

== Assigned U-boats ==
The following U-boats were assigned to 12th U-boat Flotilla at Bordeaux at various times during their service life:

- U-117
- U-118
- U-119
- U-177
- U-178
- U-179
- U-180
- U-181
- U-182
- U-195
- U-196
- U-197
- U-198
- U-199
- U-200
- U-219
- U-220
- U-233
- U-459
- U-460
- U-461
- U-462
- U-463
- U-487
- U-488
- U-489
- U-490
- U-847
- U-848
- U-849
- U-850
- U-851
- U-852
- U-859
- U-860
- U-861
- U-862
- U-863
- U-871
- U-1059
- U-1061
- U-1062

Thirty-nine of the forty-two U-boats assigned to 12th Flotilla were destroyed during their assignment. Before the base at Bordeaux was captured by the Allies, U-861, U-862 and U-1061 managed to escape, and were transferred to other U-boat flotillas.

== Assigned ex-Italian submarines ==
The following Italian submarines were captured after the Italian capitulation in September 1943 and assigned to the 12th U-boat Flotilla:

- UIT-22 (Alpino Bagnolini)
- UIT-23 (Reginaldo Giuliani)
- UIT-24 (Comandante Cappellini)
- UIT-25 (Luigi Torelli)
