= German submarine U-233 =

German World War II submarine

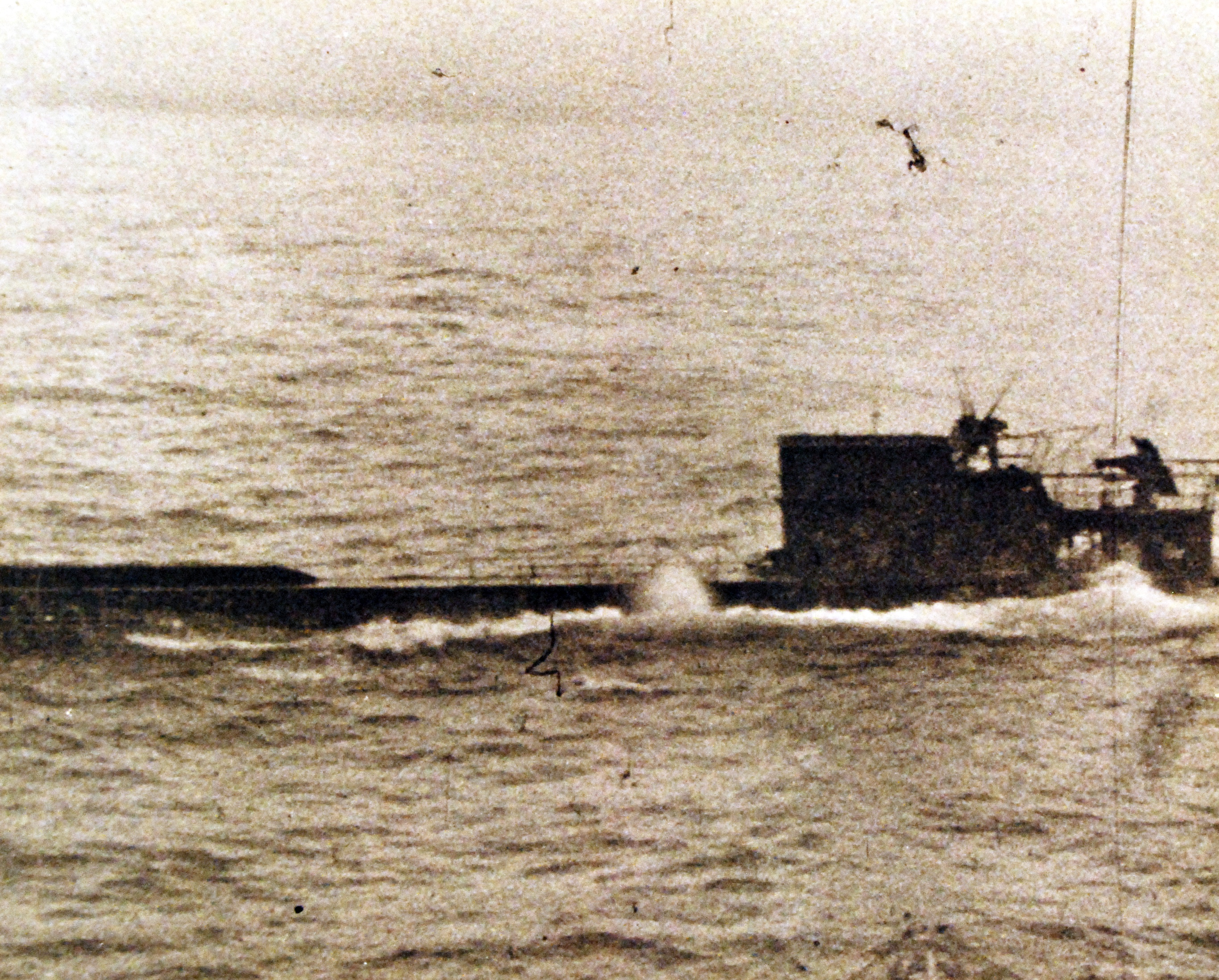
- U-233 about to be rammed by USS Thomas

History

Nazi Germany
- Name: U-233
- Ordered: 7 December 1940
- Builder: Germaniawerft, Kiel
- Yard number: 663
- Laid down: 15 August 1941
- Launched: 8 May 1943
- Commissioned: 22 September 1943
- Fate: Sunk 5 July 1944

General characteristics
- Class & type: Type X submarine minelayer
- Displacement: 1,763 tonnes (1,735 long tons) surfaced; 2,177 tonnes (2,143 long tons) submerged
- Length: 89.80 m (294 ft 7 in) o/a; 70.90 m (232 ft 7 in) pressure hull
- Beam: 9.20 m (30 ft 2 in) o/a; 4.75 m (15 ft 7 in) pressure hull
- Height: 10.20 m (33 ft 6 in)
- Draught: 4.71 m (15 ft 5 in)
- Propulsion: 2 × supercharged GW F 46 a 9 pu 9 cylinder, four-stroke diesel engines, 4,800 PS (4,700 bhp; 3,500 kW); 2 × AEG GU 720/8-287 electric motors, 1,100 PS (1,100 shp; 810 kW)
- Speed: 16.4–17 knots (30.4–31.5 km/h; 18.9–19.6 mph) surfaced; 7 knots (13 km/h; 8.1 mph) submerged
- Range: 18,450 nautical miles (34,170 km; 21,230 mi) at 10 knots (19 km/h; 12 mph) surfaced; 93 nmi (172 km; 107 mi) at 4 knots (7.4 km/h; 4.6 mph) submerged
- Test depth: Calculated crush depth: 220 m (720 ft)
- Complement: 5 officers, 47 enlisted
- Armament: 2 × 53.3 cm (21 in) stern torpedo tubes; 15 × torpedoes; 66 × SMA mines

Service record
- Part of: 4th U-boat Flotilla; 22 September 1943 – 31 May 1944; 12th U-boat Flotilla; 1 June 1944 – 5 July 1944
- Identification codes: M 54 276
- Commanders: Oblt.z.S. / Kptlt. Hans Steen; 22 September 1943 – 5 July 1944
- Operations: 1 patrol: 27 May – 5 July 1944
- Victories: None

German submarine U-233 was a Type XB U-boat of Nazi Germany's Kriegsmarine during World War II. She was laid down on 15 August 1941, launched on 8 May 1943 and commissioned on 22 September of the same year. U-233 was commanded throughout her career by Oberleutnant zur See Hans Steen.

== Service history ==
U-233 was assigned to the 4th U-boat Flotilla for training on 22 September 1943 and to the 12th U-boat Flotilla on 1 June 1944 for active service. Her first and only patrol commenced on 27 May 1944 when she departed Kiel to lay mines off Halifax.

== Fate ==
On 5 July 1944 U-233 was intercepted by ships of the USS Card (CVE-11) hunter-killer group near Halifax. She was identified by sonar, depth-charged to the surface and fired on by USS Baker (DE-190), before being rammed and sunk by USS Thomas (DE-102). 32 of her crew were killed in the action, 29 others being rescued by the escorts. Five of the crew were already dead, when the submarine was rammed. Steen was also picked up, but died of wounds the next day. US Navy report on U-233 survivors 1944

== Bibliography ==
- Blair, Clay (1 July 2000). Hitler's U-boat War: The Hunted, 1942-45. Weidenfeld & Nicolson. ISBN 978-0-304-35261-6.
- Busch, Rainer; Röll, Hans-Joachim (1999). German U-boat commanders of World War II : a biographical dictionary. Translated by Brooks, Geoffrey. London, Annapolis, Md: Greenhill Books, Naval Institute Press. ISBN 1-55750-186-6.
- Busch, Rainer; Röll, Hans-Joachim (1999). Deutsche U-Boot-Verluste von September 1939 bis Mai 1945 [German U-boat losses from September 1939 to May 1945]. Der U-Boot-Krieg (in German). Vol. IV. Hamburg, Berlin, Bonn: Mittler. ISBN 3-8132-0514-2.
- Gröner, Erich; Jung, Dieter; Maass, Martin (1991). U-boats and Mine Warfare Vessels. German Warships 1815–1945. Vol. 2. Translated by Thomas, Keith; Magowan, Rachel. London: Conway Maritime Press. ISBN 0-85177-593-4.
- Kemp, Paul (1 March 2000). U-Boats Destroyed: German Submarine Losses in the World Wars. Arms & Armour Press. ISBN 978-1-85409-515-2.
- Niestlé, Axel (1998). German U-Boat Losses During World War II: Details of Destruction. ISBN 978-1-85367-352-8.
