= USS Card =

Bogue-class escort carrier of the US Navy

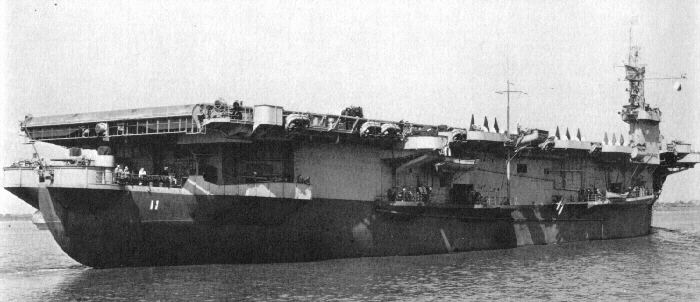
- USS Card (CVE-11), in 1943

History

United States
- Owner: War Shipping Administration (WSA)
- Operator: Isthmian Steamship Company
- Ordered: as type (C3-S-A1 hull), MC hull 178
- Awarded: 30 October 1940
- Builder: Seattle-Tacoma Shipbuilding Corporation, Tacoma, Washington
- Cost: $3,286,653
- Yard number: 10
- Way number: 2
- Laid down: 27 October 1941
- Launched: 21 February 1942
- Sponsored by: Mrs. J. Perry
- Fate: Sold for scrapping on 14 May 1971

United States
- Name: Card
- Namesake: Card Sound, Florida
- Acquired: 1 May 1942
- Commissioned: 8 November 1942
- Decommissioned: 13 May 1946
- Reclassified: ACV, 20 August 1942; CVE, 15 July 1943; CVHE, 12 June 1955
- Identification: Hull symbol: AVG-11; ACV-11; CVE-11; CVHE-11; Code letters: NUZR
- Fate: Allocated to the Military Sea Transportation Service (MSTS), 1958

United States
- Name: Card
- Operator: MSTS
- Acquired: 1958
- In service: 16 May 1958
- Out of service: 10 March 1970
- Reclassified: CVU, 1 July 1958; AKV, 7 May 1959
- Stricken: 15 September 1970
- Identification: Hull symbol: T-CVU-11; Hull symbol: T-AKV-40
- Fate: Sold for scrapping, 14 May 1971

General characteristics
- Class & type: Bogue-class escort carrier
- Displacement: 8,390 long tons (8,520 t) (standard); 13,980 long tons (14,200 t) (full load)
- Length: 465 ft (142 m) (wl); 495 ft 8 in (151.08 m) (oa); 440 ft (130 m) (fd)
- Beam: 69 ft 6 in (21.18 m) wl; 82 ft (25 m) (fd); 111 ft 6 in (33.99 m) (extreme width)
- Draft: 23 ft 3 in (7.09 m) (mean); 26 ft (7.9 m) (max)
- Installed power: 2 × Foster-Wheeler 285 psi (1,970 kPa) boilers; 8,500 shp (6,300 kW)
- Propulsion: 1 × Allis-Chalmers steam turbine; 1 × Screw
- Speed: 18 kn (33 km/h; 21 mph)
- Complement: 890 officers and enlisted
- Armament: As designed: 2 × 5 in (127 mm)/51 caliber; 10 × 20 mm (0.79 in) Oerlikon anti-aircraft cannons; Varied, ultimate armament: 2 × 5 in (127 mm)/38 cal dual-purpose gun (DP); 8 × twin 40 mm (1.57 in) Bofors anti-aircraft guns; 20 × 20 mm Oerlikon anti-aircraft cannons
- Aircraft carried: 19-24
- Aviation facilities: 1 × hydraulic catapult; 2 × elevators

Service record
- Operations: World War II; Vietnam War
- Awards: Presidential Unit Citation; 3 × battle stars (WWII)

USS Card (AVG/ ACV/ CVE/ CVHE/ CVU/T-CVU-11/ T-AKV-40) was an American Bogue-class escort carrier that saw service in World War II. She was named for Card Sound, a continuation of Biscayne Bay, south of Miami, Florida. She was the flagship of Task Group 21.14 (TG 21.14), a hunter-killer group formed to destroy German submarines in the North Atlantic.

In 1964, while operating as an aircraft ferry, Card was sunk with explosives planted by two Viet Cong commandos in the Harbor of Saigon, South Vietnam. She was refloated 17 days later and returned to service after extensive repairs.

== Construction and commissioning ==
Card's hull was laid down on 27 October 1941, under a United States Maritime Commission contract, as MC Hull #178, a Type C3-S-A1 cargo ship, at Seattle-Tacoma Shipbuilding in Tacoma, Washington. She was launched on 27 February 1942, sponsored by Mrs J. Perry.

She was acquired by the U.S. Navy on 1 May 1942 and conversion into an aircraft carrier, designated as AVG (Aircraft Escort Vessel) 11, was begun. During her reconstruction, on 20 August 1942, she was redesignated as ACV (Auxiliary Aircraft Carrier) 11. She was commissioned on 8 November 1942. Her ship's crew (not counting aviation personnel) at the time of her commissioning included 61 officers and 449 enlisted men.

== Aircraft carried ==
Card had capacity for up to 24 fighter and anti-submarine aircraft, normally a mixture of Grumman (General Motors) Wildcats and Avengers. The squadron initially assigned was designated VC (Composite Squadron) Eleven, but by 1944 this had been replaced with VC-55, with essentially the same composition.

== Service history ==
=== World War II ===
Departing San Diego, California on 18 January 1943, Card arrived at Hampton Roads, Virginia on 1 February for training in the Chesapeake Bay. Captain Arnold J. Isbell assumed command of the Card on April 17, 1943. Her initial mission began in May 1943 as she escorted slow convoy UGS-8A of troopships and supply vessels to Casablanca in French Morocco. This convoy shipped six months after the Allied invasion of North Africa and was assembled in preparation for the subsequent invasion of Sicily. With 129 merchant ships and 19 escorts, it was the largest convoy of the war to date. During this crossing Card provided daily anti-submarine air patrols against U-boats while, per her orders, remaining close to the convoy. However, while returning to Norfolk escorting a convoy (GUS-8) made up largely of empty ships, Card's orders permitted her to operate more freely against reported concentrations of U-boats as long as she could get back to the convoy in time to protect it. Thus began the evolution toward totally independent Hunter-Killer Group (HKG) operations.

Card became one of the first of fourteen US CVEs around which U.S. anti-submarine HKGs would be built. These groups used Ultra intelligence distilled from Enigma decrypts to locate and destroy U-boats and their replenishment vessels. They became feasible as increasing numbers of CVEs became available, along with more and better escort ships and aircraft, and as responsibility for escorting direct North America-to-Britain convoys was passed largely into the hands of the British Royal Navy and the Royal Canadian Navy.

The HKGs became increasingly effective with the development of improved anti-submarine weapons including Mark 24 (FIDO) homing torpedoes and Hedgehog forward-throwing depth charges. Like other US HKGs, those based on Card operated independently of convoys but, unlike Royal Navy HKGs (which generally did not include an aircraft carrier), she operated without centralized control.

On 15 July Card was reclassified from an Auxiliary Aircraft Carrier (ACV) to an Escort Carrier (CVE). She steamed from Norfolk on 27 July as flagship for TG 21.14, an HKG formed for offensive operations against German submarines. This deployment lasted until 10 September.

On 7 August her Avenger aircraft attacked U-117 while refueling U-66 at 39°32′N 38°21′W. The Avengers dropped depth charges and an acoustic homing torpedo (codenamed "FIDO") near U-117 and U-66. Two more Avengers and two Wildcats arrived later and forced U-117 to dive before dropping more depth charges and another FIDO. U-117 was hit by one of two acoustic torpedoes and sank with the loss of all hands. U-66 escaped and returned to the boat's homeport, Lorient.

On 8 August 1943 U-664 fired three torpedoes at the escort carrier but all missed. The following day Aircraft from Card sank U-664 in position 40°12′N 37°29′W, west-southwest of Corvo Island, with depth charges from Avengers. Seven crew members were killed and 44 rescued by USS Borie.

On 11 August her aircraft sank U-525 at 28°19′N 37°58′W north-west of the Azores with all hands.

On 27 August her aircraft sank U-847 in the Sargasso Sea at 28°19′N 37°58′W, with FIDO torpedoes, all 63 hands were lost.

Her second deployment was from 25 September to 9 November 1943. Lt. (j.g.) Robert. L. Sterns spotted three submarines, U-264, U-422, and U-455, refueling from the Type XIV supply and replenishment ("Milchkuh") U-460, on 4 October, north of the Azores. Coming under heavy anti-aircraft fire from the three U-boats, Lt. Sterns radioed for reinforcements and three more TBM Avengers joined the battle. Sterns dropped a "Fido" acoustic torpedo that sunk U-460 43°13′N 28°58′W with 62 crew lost and two rescued, and U-422 was sunk at 43°18′N 28°58′W with all hands.

On 13 October, Avenger and Wildcat aircraft sank U-402 at 48°56′N 29°41′W, with an acoustic FIDO torpedo.

On 31 October, three of her Avenger aircraft sank U-584, at 49°14′N 31°55′W, 580 nmi (1,070 km; 670 mi) north of Flores Island, with FIDOs and attacked U-91 (1941), at the same location, but this boat escaped undamaged.

The fifth and final sinking of the deployment was on 1 November, by one of Card's escorts. After a violent, close-range surface action, Borie rammed and sank U-405 in 49°00′N 31°14′W, north of the Azores. Too badly damaged to be saved, Borie had to be sunk by a 500 lb (227 kg) bomb dropped by one of Card's Avengers at 50°12′N 30°48′W, 1,000 nmi (1,900 km; 1,200 mi) east of Cape Race, Newfoundland.

For her antisubmarine activities from 27 July to 25 October, as part of TG21.14, Card and her task group were awarded the Presidential Unit Citation. Card became the first escort carrier to receive such an award for combating German submarines.

Card began her third hunter-killer deployment 24 November 1943 in the North Atlantic. Late on 23 December, the group ran into wolfpack "Borkum"; Card had 12 contacts in 5 hours. Card and her escort Decatur were attacked by U-415 and one of her Wildcats spotted the blockade runner Osorno steaming for the Gironde estuary. One of Cards escorts, Schenck sank U-645 at 45°20′N 21°40′W on 24 December.

The escort Leary, was sunk by the combined efforts of U-275 and U-382 at 45°00′N 22°00′W, 585 nmi (1,083 km; 673 mi) west northwest of Cape Finisterre, Spain. Card dodged submarines all night with only Decatur as screen, while Schenck rescued survivors from Leary. The task group returned to Norfolk base on 2 January 1944.

From 18 March to 17 May 1944, Card operated on transport duty between Norfolk and Casablanca. She then underwent overhaul until 4 June, when she steamed for Quonset Point, to hold pilot qualification exercises. She returned to Norfolk, 21 June, to serve as the nucleus of TG 22.10. The hunter-killer unit departed Norfolk, 25 June, and on 5 July, two of her escorts, Thomas and Baker, sank U-233 at 42°16′N 59°49′W. Thirty survivors, including the mortally wounded commanding officer of the submarine, were taken on board Card and put ashore at Boston, Massachusetts, the next day.

Her next anti-submarine cruise was in the Caribbean, and uneventful, 10 July – 23 August 1944. She sortied 18 September as the flagship of TG 22.2 for patrol off the Azores, during which she cooperated with British Escort Group 9 to attack a submarine on 12 October. After another patrol with TG 22.2, 1 December 1944 – 22 January 1945, Card entered Philadelphia Naval Shipyard for overhaul until 7 February.

She then transported Army aircraft and Army and Navy personnel to Liverpool, returning to Norfolk 12 March. From 21 March to 24 May, Card was based on Quonset Point, conducting carrier pilot qualifications. She ferried men and aircraft to Guantanamo Bay, 21–24 June, then transited the Panama Canal, to transport materiel to Pearl Harbor and Guam, returning to San Diego, 14 August.

Assigned to "Magic Carpet" duty, she made two voyages to Pearl Harbor, and one to the western Pacific, from 21 August to 16 December, returning servicemen to the west coast. Card departed Alameda, California, 7 January 1946, for the east coast where she was placed out of commission in reserve at Norfolk, 13 May.

She was reclassified as a helicopter escort carrier CVHE-11, 12 June 1955; a utility carrier CVU-11, 1 July 1958; and an aviation transport AKV-40, 7 May 1959.

==== Awards ====
In addition to her Presidential Unit Citation, Card received three battle stars for service in World War II.

=== Vietnam War ===
The ship was reactivated on 16 May 1958, as USNS Card and operated with a civilian crew under Military Sea Transportation Service (MSTS) control as an aircraft transport. On 15 December 1961, Card left Quonset Point Naval Air Station in Rhode Island, with a cargo of H-21 Shawnee helicopters and soldiers from Fort Devens, bound for Vietnam. At Subic Bay, in the Philippines, the cargo and troops were transferred to the helicopter carrier Princeton, which arrived and unloaded off the coast of Da Nang, on 25 January 1962.

On 2 May 1964, while Card was moored dockside in Saigon, a Viet Cong frogman planted an explosive charge that blew a hole in the hull, killing five crewmen. Card settled in 20 ft (6.1 m) of water. She was patched, pumped out, and raised on 19 May, before being towed to Subic Bay, and then Yokosuka for repairs. Card returned to service on 11 December. The attack has parallels to the suicide bombing of Cole, in terms of being an example of "cost-effective" asymmetric warfare.

During the latter part of 1967, and early part of 1968, Card brought US military helicopters to the Republic of South Vietnam. These helicopters were assembled on board the ship by members of the 388th Transportation Company, 765th Transportation Battalion, and then flown to the US Army airfield at Vũng Tàu. From there the helicopters were assigned to aviation units.

== Fate ==
Card entered the Pacific Reserve Fleet, at Olympia, Washington, on 10 March 1970, was sold for scrapping to Zidell Explorations, Inc., a shipbreaker, for $93,899.99, on 14 May 1971 and withdrawn from the fleet on 9 June 1971.

== Legacy ==
By the end of World War II, Card's aircraft and escorts destroyed a total of 11 German submarines, making her, along with USS Bogue with 9 German and 2 Japanese submarines, the most successful ships of her class.

Although there were fears that using Ultra intelligence intercepts for targeted submarine-hunting risked disclosing the existence of this intelligence source, the success of the HKGs, and the contribution of Ultra to this success (all 11 submarines sunk by Card's HKG, and, in fact, all but one sunk by US HKGs during the war, were located with the help of Ultra)--and the fact that, while the Germans suspected that some sort of security failure had contributed to their losses, internal investigations found nothing--made it clear that the risk had been worthwhile.

== Awards ==
- Presidential Unit Citation
- American Campaign Medal with one battle star
- European-African-Middle Eastern Campaign Medal with two battle stars
- World War II Victory Medal
- Navy Occupation Medal with "ASIA" clasp
- National Defense Service Medal
- Armed Forces Expeditionary Medal
- Vietnam Service Medal with one campaign star
- Republic of Vietnam Campaign Medal

== Bibliography ==
- Beckhusen, Robert (9 October 2019). "During the Vietnam War, Commandos Sunk a U.S. Aircraft Carrier It was a huge blow". The National Interest.
- "Card". DANFS. Navy Department, Naval History and Heritage Command. 27 April 2016. This article incorporates text from this source, which is in the public domain.
- Cressman, Robert (2000). The official chronology of the U.S. Navy in World War II. Annapolis, Maryland: Naval Institute Press. ISBN 978-1-55750-149-3. This article incorporates text from this source, which is in the public domain.
- Gerhardt, Frank A. "Card". United States Maritime Commission 1936 thru 1950.
- Stubblebine, David (November 2021). "CARD". World War II Database.
- Wise, John E. (2005). U-505: The Final Journey. Washington D.C.: U.S. Naval Institute Press. ISBN 1-59114-967-3.
- Yarnall, Paul (22 October 2020). "USS CARD (ACV-11)". NavSource.
- Y'Blood, William T. (1983). Hunter-Killer US Escort Carriers in the Battle of the Atlantic. Annapolis, Maryland: Naval Institute Press. ISBN 0-87021-286-9.
- Y'Blood, William T. (1987). The Little Giants – U.S. Escort Carriers Against Japan. Annapolis, Maryland: Naval Institute Press. ISBN 0-87021-275-3.
