= German submarine U-118 (1941) =

German World War II submarine

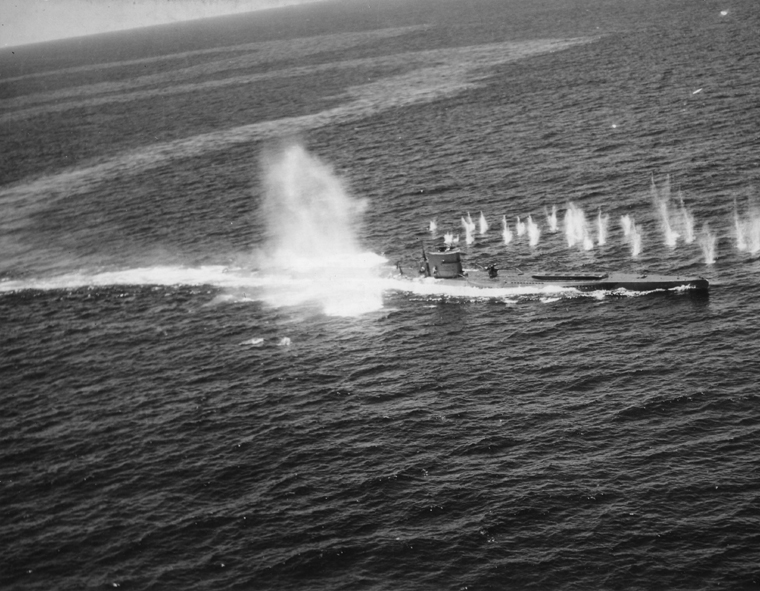
- U-118 under attack by aircraft from USS Bogue

History

Nazi Germany
- Name: U-118
- Ordered: 31 January 1939
- Builder: Germaniawerft, Kiel
- Yard number: 617
- Laid down: 1 March 1940
- Launched: 3 May 1941; 23 September 1941
- Commissioned: 23 September 1941; 6 December 1941
- Fate: Sunk on 12 June 1943 by US aircraft

General characteristics
- Class & type: Type X submarine minelayer
- Displacement: 1,763 tonnes (1,735 long tons) surfaced; 2,177 tonnes (2,143 long tons) submerged
- Length: 89.80 m (294 ft 7 in) o/a; 70.90 m (232 ft 7 in) pressure hull
- Beam: 9.20 m (30 ft 2 in) o/a; 4.75 m (15 ft 7 in) pressure hull
- Height: 10.20 m (33 ft 6 in)
- Draught: 4.71 m (15 ft 5 in)
- Propulsion: 2 × supercharged GW F 46 a 9 pu 9 cylinder, four-stroke diesel engines, 4,800 PS (4,700 bhp; 3,500 kW); 2 × AEG GU 720/8-287 electric motors, 1,100 PS (1,100 shp; 810 kW)
- Speed: 16.4–17 knots (30.4–31.5 km/h; 18.9–19.6 mph) surfaced; 7 knots (13 km/h; 8.1 mph) submerged
- Range: 18,450 nautical miles (34,170 km; 21,230 mi) at 10 knots (19 km/h; 12 mph) surfaced; 93 nmi (172 km; 107 mi) at 4 knots (7.4 km/h; 4.6 mph) submerged
- Test depth: Calculated crush depth: 220 m (720 ft)
- Complement: 5 officers, 47 enlisted
- Armament: 2 × 53.3 cm (21 in) stern torpedo tubes; 15 × torpedoes; 66 × SMA mines; 1 × 10.5 cm (4.1 in) deck gun (200 rounds)

Service record
- Part of: 4th U-boat Flotilla; 6 December 1941 - 30 September 1942; 10th U-boat Flotilla; 1 - 31 October 1942; 12th U-boat Flotilla; 1 November 1942 - 12 June 1943
- Identification codes: M 41 181
- Commanders: K.Kapt. Werner Czygan; 6 December 1941 – 12 June 1943
- Operations: 4 patrols: 1st patrol: 19 September - 16 October 1942; 2nd patrol: a. 12 November - 13 December 1942; b. 7–8 January 1943; 3rd patrol: 25 January - 26 February 1943; 4th patrol: 25 May - 12 June 1943
- Victories: 3 merchant ships sunk (14,064 GRT); 1 warship sunk (925 tons); 2 merchant ships damaged (11,945 GRT)

German submarine U-118 was a Type XB minelaying U-boat of Nazi Germany's Kriegsmarine during World War II.

She was ordered on 31 January 1939 and laid down on 1 March 1940 at the Friedrich Krupp Germaniawerft in Kiel, as yard number 617. She was launched on 23 September 1941 and commissioned on 6 December under the command of Korvettenkapitän Werner Czygan.

After a period of training as part of the 4th U-boat Flotilla, U-118 was assigned to the front-line as part of the 10th U-boat Flotilla on 1 October 1942. She was reassigned to the 12th U-boat Flotilla a month later on 1 November. She was a member of three wolfpacks.

== Operational career ==
U-118 sank three merchant vessels and a warship; a total of 14,064 gross register tons (GRT) and 925 tons of shipping in three patrols. She also damaged two others, for a total of 11,945 GRT.

=== First patrol ===
U-118's first patrol began on 19 September 1942 with her departure from Kiel. Her route took her across the North Sea, through the 'gap' between Iceland and the Faroe Islands and into the Atlantic Ocean. The boat was attacked south of Iceland by an aircraft on 29 September which caused only slight damage. She reached her destination, Lorient, in occupied France, on 16 October.

=== Second patrol ===
Her second sortie was to an area between the Azores and Madeira. It was uneventful.

She carried out a short transit voyage from Lorient to Brest on 12 and 13 December 1942.

=== Third patrol ===
The boat's third patrol was the longest, and the most successful. Departing Brest on 25 January 1943, she sailed west of Gibraltar, where she sank Baltonia, Empire Mordred and Mary Slessor on 7 February and damaged Duero with a mine on the tenth. She was also responsible for the sinking of the corvette HMCS Weyburn on 22 February. The Canadian ship struck a mine that U-118 had laid on the first. Despite best efforts by the crew to remove depth charge primers, two exploded when the ship sank, killing men in the water and disabling a nearby destroyer. U-118 returned to France, to Bordeaux, on 26 February.

=== Fourth patrol and loss ===
U-118 had been at sea less than a month when she was attacked by two aircraft west of the Canary Islands followed by a further eight planes from the carrier USS Bogue. Following a heavy expenditure of bombs, .50" and .30" ammunition; the U-boat exploded into two parts, oil and debris were flung into the air. 16 men survived to be picked up by the escort vessel USS Osmond Ingram.

She was sunk in position 30°49′N 33°49′W

=== Wolfpacks ===
U-118 took part in three wolfpacks, namely:

- Wotan (5 – 7 October 1942)
- Westwall (28 – 30 November 1942)
- Rochen (13 – 14 February 1943)

== Summary of raiding history ==
| Date | Name | Nationality | Tonnage (Note: Merchant ship tonnages are in gross register tons. Military vessels are listed by tons displacement.) | Fate |
|---|---|---|---|---|
| 7 February 1943 | Baltonia | United Kingdom | 2,013 | Sunk (Mine) |
| 7 February 1943 | Empire Mordred | United Kingdom | 7,024 | Sunk (Mine) |
| 7 February 1943 | Mary Slessor | United Kingdom | 5,027 | Sunk (Mine) |
| 10 February 1943 | Duero | Spain | 2,008 | Damaged (Mine) |
| 22 February 1943 | HMCS Weyburn | Royal Canadian Navy | 925 | Sunk (Mine) |
| 22 February 1943 | Thorsholm | Norway | 9,937 | Damaged (Mine) |

== Bibliography ==
- Busch, Rainer; Röll, Hans-Joachim (1999). German U-boat commanders of World War II : a biographical dictionary. Translated by Brooks, Geoffrey. London, Annapolis, Md: Greenhill Books, Naval Institute Press. ISBN 1-55750-186-6.
- Busch, Rainer; Röll, Hans-Joachim (1999). Deutsche U-Boot-Verluste von September 1939 bis Mai 1945 [German U-boat losses from September 1939 to May 1945]. Der U-Boot-Krieg (in German). Vol. IV. Hamburg, Berlin, Bonn: Mittler. ISBN 3-8132-0514-2.
- Gröner, Erich (1985). Die deutschen Kriegsschiffe 1815–1945 / 3, U-Boote, Hilfskreuzer, Minenschiffe, Netzleger, Sperrbrecher (in German). Koblenz: Bernard & Graefe. ISBN 3-7637-4802-4. OCLC 310610321.
- Gröner, Erich; Jung, Dieter; Maass, Martin (1991). U-boats and Mine Warfare Vessels. German Warships 1815–1945. Vol. 2. Translated by Thomas, Keith; Magowan, Rachel. London: Conway Maritime Press. ISBN 0-85177-593-4.
- Kemp, Paul (1999). U-Boats Destroyed - German Submarine Losses in the World Wars. London: Arms & Armour. ISBN 1-85409-515-3.
