= German submarine U-460 =

German World War II submarine

History

Nazi Germany
- Name: U-460
- Ordered: 14 May 1940
- Builder: Deutsche Werke, Kiel
- Yard number: 291
- Laid down: 30 November 1940
- Launched: 13 September 1941
- Commissioned: 24 December 1941
- Fate: Sunk by depth charges on 4 October 1943

General characteristics
- Class & type: Type XIV ocean-going submarine tanker
- Displacement: 1,688 t (1,661 long tons) surfaced; 1,932 t (1,901 long tons) submerged
- Length: 67.10 m (220 ft 2 in) o/a; 48.51 m (159 ft 2 in) pressure hull
- Beam: 9.35 m (30 ft 8 in) o/a; 4.90 m (16 ft 1 in) pressure hull
- Height: 11.70 m (38 ft 5 in)
- Draught: 6.51 m (21 ft 4 in)
- Installed power: 2,800–3,200 PS (2,100–2,400 kW; 2,800–3,200 bhp) (diesels); 750 PS (550 kW; 740 shp) (electric)
- Propulsion: 2 shafts; 2 × diesel engines; 2 × electric motors
- Speed: 14.4–14.9 knots (26.7–27.6 km/h; 16.6–17.1 mph) surfaced; 6.2 knots (11.5 km/h; 7.1 mph) submerged
- Range: 12,350 nmi (22,870 km; 14,210 mi) at 10 knots (19 km/h; 12 mph) surfaced; 55 nmi (102 km; 63 mi) at 4 knots (7.4 km/h; 4.6 mph) submerged
- Test depth: 240 m (790 ft)
- Complement: 6 officers and 47 enlisted
- Armament: 2 × 3.7 cm (1.5 in) SK C/30 anti-aircraft guns; 1 × 2 cm (0.79 in) C/30 AA gun

Service record
- Part of: 4th U-boat Flotilla; 24 December 1941 – 30 June 1942; 10th U-boat Flotilla; 1 July – 31 October 1942; 12th U-boat Flotilla; 1 November 1942 – 4 October 1943
- Identification codes: M 47 974
- Commanders: Kptlt. Friedrich Schäfer; 24 December 1941 – 1 August 1942; Kptlt. Ebe Schnoor; 1 August 1942 – 4 October 1943
- Operations: 6 patrols: 1st patrol: 7 June – 31 July 1942; 2nd patrol: 27 August – 12 October 1942; 3rd patrol: 11 November – 19 December 1942; 4th patrol: 27 January – 5 March 1943; 5th patrol: a. 24 April – 25 June 1943; b. 23 – 25 August 1943; 6th patrol: 30 August – 4 October 1943
- Victories: None

German submarine U-460 was a Type XIV supply and replenishment U-boat ("Milchkuh") of Nazi Germany's Kriegsmarine during World War II.

Her keel was laid down on 30 November 1940 by Deutsche Werke in Kiel as yard number 291. She was launched on 13 September 1941 and commissioned on 24 December that same year, with Kapitänleutnant Friedrich Schäfer in command. Schäfer was relieved by Kptlt. Ebe Schnoor on 1 August 1942. She carried out training with the 4th U-boat Flotilla before moving on to the 10th and 12th flotillas for operations.

== Design ==
German Type XIV submarines were shortened versions of the Type IXDs. U-460 had a displacement of 1,688 tonnes (1,661 long tons) when at the surface and 1,932 tonnes (1,901 long tons) while submerged. The U-boat had a total length of 67.10 m (220 ft 2 in), a pressure hull length of 48.51 m (159 ft 2 in), a beam of 9.35 m (30 ft 8 in), a height of 11.70 m (38 ft 5 in), and a draught of 6.51 m (21 ft 4 in). The submarine was powered by two Germaniawerft supercharged four-stroke, six-cylinder diesel engines producing a total of 2,800–3,200 metric horsepower (2,060–2,350 kW; 2,760–3,160 shp) for use while surfaced, two Siemens-Schuckert 2 GU 345/38-8 double-acting electric motors producing a total of 750 metric horsepower (550 kW; 740 shp) for use while submerged. She had two shafts and two propellers. The boat was capable of operating at depths of up to 240 metres (790 ft).

The submarine had a maximum surface speed of 14.4–14.9 knots (26.7–27.6 km/h; 16.6–17.1 mph) and a maximum submerged speed of 6.2 knots (11.5 km/h; 7.1 mph). When submerged, the boat could operate for 120 nautical miles (220 km; 140 mi) at 2 knots (3.7 km/h; 2.3 mph); when surfaced, she could travel 12,350 nautical miles (22,870 km; 14,210 mi) at 10 knots (19 km/h; 12 mph). U-460 was not fitted with torpedo tubes or deck guns, but had two 3.7 cm (1.5 in) SK C/30 anti-aircraft guns with 2500 rounds as well as a 2 cm (0.79 in) C/30 guns with 3000 rounds. The boat had a complement of fifty-three.

== Operational career ==
U-460 conducted six patrols. As a supply boat, she avoided combat.

=== First and second patrols ===
U-460's first patrol started with her departure from Kiel on 7 June 1942, taking her out to mid-Atlantic through the gap between Iceland and the Faeroe Islands. She arrived in St. Nazaire in occupied France on 31 July.

Her second foray, which began on 27 August 1942, saw her steam west out of the Bay of Biscay, south, then south southeast toward the Cape Verde Islands in the South Atlantic.

=== Third, fourth and fifth patrols ===
U-460's third patrol was due west from St. Nazaire and lasted 39 days, a typical length.

Her fourth sortie was almost a repeat of her third, except it terminated in Bordeaux.

The U-boat's fifth patrol commenced on 24 April 1943 and lasted 63 days, her longest. It took her to a point almost equidistant with the South American and African coasts. She returned to Bordeaux on 25 June.

=== Sixth patrol and loss ===
She left Bordeaux for the last time on 30 August 1943. On 4 October, U-460 was resupplying the submarines U-264, U-422, and U-455 in the North Atlantic north of the Azores, when they were attacked by American Avenger and Wildcat aircraft of US Navy squadron VC-9 flying from the escort carrier Card. While the other U-boats submerged and escaped, U-460 was sunk by depth charges in position 43°18′N 28°58′W. 62 were killed; two crewmen survived.

== Bibliography ==
- Busch, Rainer; Röll, Hans-Joachim (1999). German U-boat commanders of World War II : a biographical dictionary. Translated by Brooks, Geoffrey. London, Annapolis, Md: Greenhill Books, Naval Institute Press. ISBN 1-55750-186-6.
- Busch, Rainer; Röll, Hans-Joachim (1999). Deutsche U-Boot-Verluste von September 1939 bis Mai 1945 [German U-boat losses from September 1939 to May 1945]. Der U-Boot-Krieg (in German). Vol. IV. Hamburg, Berlin, Bonn: Mittler. ISBN 3-8132-0514-2.
- Gröner, Erich; Jung, Dieter; Maass, Martin (1991). U-boats and Mine Warfare Vessels. German Warships 1815–1945. Vol. 2. Translated by Thomas, Keith; Magowan, Rachel. London: Conway Maritime Press. ISBN 0-85177-593-4.
- Kemp, Paul (1999). U-Boats Destroyed – German Submarine Losses in the World Wars. London: Arms & Armour. ISBN 1-85409-515-3.
