= Type X submarine =

German type of large ocean-going minelaying submarines

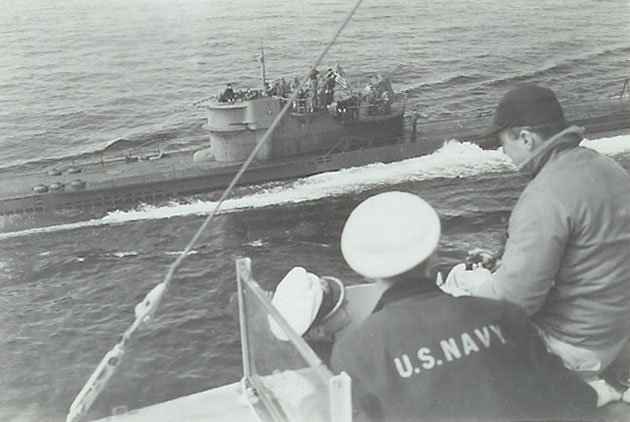
- U-234 surrenders to USS Sutton, 1945

Class overview
- Builders: Germaniawerft, Kiel
- Operators: Kriegsmarine; Imperial Japanese Navy
- Built: 1939–1944
- In commission: 1941–1945
- Completed: 8
- Lost: 6

General characteristics
- Class & type: Submarine minelayer
- Displacement: 1,763 tonnes (1,735 long tons) surfaced; 2,177 tonnes (2,143 long tons) submerged
- Length: 89.80 m (294 ft 7 in) o/a; 70.90 m (232 ft 7 in) pressure hull
- Beam: 9.20 m (30 ft 2 in) o/a; 4.75 m (15 ft 7 in) pressure hull
- Height: 10.20 m (33 ft 6 in)
- Draught: 4.71 m (15 ft 5 in)
- Propulsion: 2 × diesel engines, 4,800 PS (4,700 bhp; 3,500 kW); 2 × electric motors, 1,100 PS (1,100 shp; 810 kW)
- Speed: 17 knots (31 km/h; 20 mph) surfaced; 7 knots (13 km/h; 8.1 mph) submerged
- Range: 18,450 nautical miles (34,170 km; 21,230 mi) at 10 knots (19 km/h; 12 mph) surfaced; 93 nmi (172 km; 107 mi) at 4 knots (7.4 km/h; 4.6 mph) submerged
- Test depth: Calculated crush depth: 220 m (720 ft)
- Complement: 5 officers, 47 enlisted
- Armament: 2 × 53.3 cm (21 in) stern torpedo tubes; 11 × torpedoes; 66 × SMA mines; 1 × 10.5 cm (4.1 in); 1 x 3.7 cm SK C/30; 1 x 2 cm (0.79 in) C/30

The Type X (XB) U-boat was a class of large minelaying U-boats built for Nazi Germany's Kriegsmarine from 1939 to 1945. Eight were built during World War II. Although intended as long-range mine-layers, they were mainly used as supply submarines, a task they shared with the Type XIV. By 1944, six were lost and the two remaining Type XB boats were converted to transport submarines to bring valuable cargo to Japan. At the end of the war, one surrendered at sea to the United States Navy and the last one was captured by the Imperial Japanese Navy at the German base of Jakarta.

== Design ==
All U-boats of the German Kriegsmarine were potential minelayers since the Germans had devised TMB and TMC torpedo-mines which could be ejected through torpedo tubes. These torpedo-mines were ground mines which had to be laid in shallow waters of maximum 20 m (65 ft 7 in) depth. For minelaying in deeper waters a torpedo mine would not be effective since the space needed for the anchor of the mine would reduce the size of the warhead. The Germans had in mind to develop a larger SMA moored mine, to be laid through mine shafts by a large, dedicated submarine.

Two designs were produced for a minelaying submarine: the initial Type X design had the same layout as the world war I Type UE II, with a bow torpedo compartment with four torpedo tubes, and dry storage for mines in a stern compartment, which were ejected through horizontal tubes. Dry storage allowed mine detonators to be individually adjusted before launch. This submarine was projected to displace 2,284 t (2,248 long tons). A further variant, the Type XA was projected to displace up to 2,500 t (2,500 long tons), by adding lateral mine shafts in the saddle tanks for mines in wet storage with pre-set detonators. But once it became possible to adjust remotely the mine detonators in wet storage, the German navy adopted a much smaller Type XB submarine, which kept the saddle mine shafts but substituted the stern dry storage mine compartment for a bow wet storage mine compartment with six vertical shafts. With no space needed for mines in the aft engine compartment, larger diesel engines could be installed for better surface speed. Instead of the four bow torpedo tubes, two stern torpedo tubes were installed.

On 25 September 1937, plans were approved to start building a Type XB U-boat on 1 October 1938 at the Germaniawerft in Kiel, with a building time of two years. The design of the large U-boat took more time than foreseen, and construction was delayed. In October 1938, after Hitler made clear he wanted to reject the Anglo-German Naval Agreement, the German navy initiated the Plan Z for the construction of a large German fleet. The plan Z called for the construction of nine Type XB by 1944: three to be built between April 1939 and September 1941, one between April 1941 and December 1943 and a further five between April 1942 and September 1945. The first three boats U-116 - U-118 were ordered in January 1939. At the outbreak of World War II, the plan Z was abandoned and various alternative U-boat construction programmes were considered. On 15 June 1940 a restricted Construction Programme was approved, which foresaw the delivery of four Type XBs between April 1941 and January 1942. As Dönitz supported the construction of large U-boat minelayers for operations in remote waters, by June 1941 four more were ordered, for delivery in 1942–43.

== Characteristics ==
A Type XB U-boat had an overall length of 89.90 m (294 ft 11 in), a beam of 9.20 m (30 ft 2 in) and a draft of 4.71 m (15 ft 5 in). The displacement on the surface was 1,763 t (1,735 long tons), and submerged 2,177 t (2,140 long tons). The length of the pressure hull was 70.90 m (232 ft 7 in) and had a maximum diameter of 4.75 m (15 ft 7 in).

The boat was powered on the surface by two nine-cylinder, four-stroke MAN AG F46 a 9 pu diesel engines, giving a total of 4,200 brake horsepower (3,100 kW), which gave a maximum speed of 17 knots (31 km/h; 20 mph). With a fuel capacity of 368 t (362 long tons), the range was 18,450 nmi (34,170 km; 21,230 mi) at 10 knots (19 km/h; 12 mph). When submerged it was propelled by two double-acting AEG GU 720/8-287 electric motors, giving a total of 800 kilowatts (1,100 hp). Maximum submerged speed was 7 knots (13 km/h; 8.1 mph) and maximum range was 93 nmi (172 km; 107 mi) at 4 knots (7.4 km/h; 4.6 mph). Their complement consisted of five officers and forty-seven men.

A Type XB was equipped with sixty-six SMA mines, stored in twenty-four two-mine shafts in the saddle tanks, and six three-mine shafts going through the pressure hull in the forward part of the hull. There were no bow torpedo tubes, but two 53.3 cm (21.0 in) torpedo tubes were installed at the stern. Five torpedoes were stored internally, two in the torpedo tubes and three below the main deck. A further six spare torpedoes were stored externally below the upper deck in pressure-tight canisters. As built, they had a gun armament consisting of one 10.5 cm (4.1 in) deck gun mounted before the conning tower, one 3.7 cm SK C/30 mounted behind the conning tower and one 2 cm (0.79 in) C/30 mounted on a platform aft of the conning tower. By 1944 the deck had disappeared as it was not useful, and the single 2 cm gun was replaced by two twin 2 cm guns.

== Service history ==
When the first Type XB entered service in 1941, the SMA mine suffered from premature explosions and was not yet ready for operational use. As these large U-boats carried a lot of fuel and since there was a shortage of Type XIV supply U-boats, it was decided to convert the Type XB temporarily to supply U-boats. This conversion involved the installation of up to eight additional external torpedo canisters. These extra canisters were placed in pallets on top of the saddle tanks, one pair forward and three pairs at the rear. The forward pair of canisters was protected with a shield to reduce water resistance.

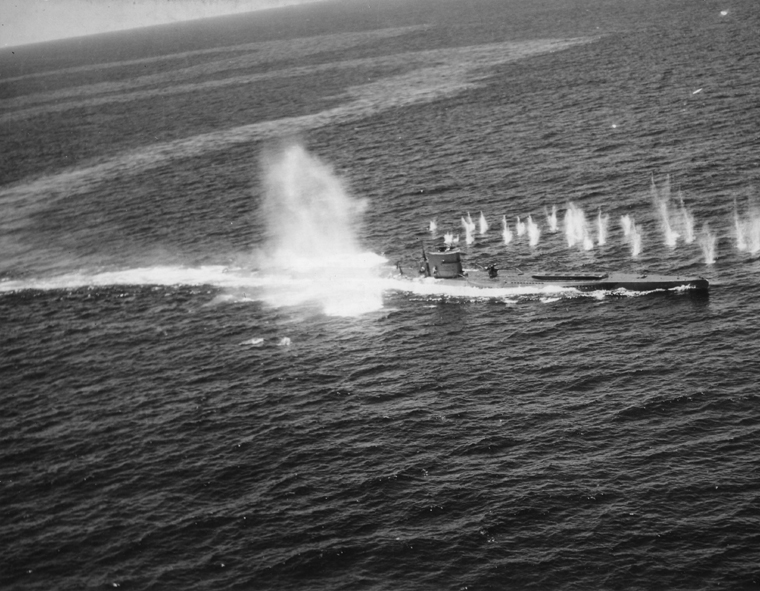
U-118 under attack by aircraft from USS Bogue

U-116 was the first boat of her class to start a patrol: on 25 April 1942 she left harbor to supply the U-boats of wolfpack Hecht, but on 29 April U-116 had to abort the patrol after sustaining damage in an air attack. She resailed on 16 May to support Hecht in the North Atlantic and completed her first successful mission on 9 June. On her second mission she supported wolfpack Hai in the South Atlantic. During the attack of the wolfpack on convoy OS-33 she sank one merchant ship and shared in the credit for another one with U-201.

By September 1942, the next two Type XB, U-117 and U-118, became available for operations and as there were still only two Type XIV operational, they were also badly needed for supply missions. U-118 executed her first supply mission between 19 September and 18 October when she transferred from Germany to France. A second supply mission was executed between 11 November and 13 December. U-116 left France for her third mission on 22 September but went missing in the beginning of October. U-117 started her first patrol on 12 October by laying an unproductive minefield on the North-West coast of Iceland and supplying U-boats in the North Atlantic. A second supply mission to the same area was executed between 23 December and 17 February 1943.

In 1943 the Type XBs combined supply patrols with a minelaying mission: when the fourth Type XB U-119 executed her first patrol between 6 February and 3 April 1943, she laid first a fruitless minefield before the harbor of Reykjavík (Note: Miller situates the minefield at Reykjavik, Blair situates it at St. Georges Channel, Nova Scotia.) and then continued to the Azores to supply U-boats. Likewise, in February U-118 laid a minefield at Gibraltar, and in April U-117 mined the harbors of Fedala and Casablanca before both U-boats supplied U-boats in the Mid-Atlantic on their third missions. All three remaining Type XB were lost on their subsequent patrol: U-118 was sunk on 12 June after laying a minefield at Halifax, Nova Scotia and supplying some U-boats in the Mid-Atlantic, U-119 was lost on 24 June on her return voyage to France after laying a minefield and supplying U-boats in the same areas, and U-117 was lost on 7 August after laying a minefield off New York and supplying U-boats in the North Atlantic.

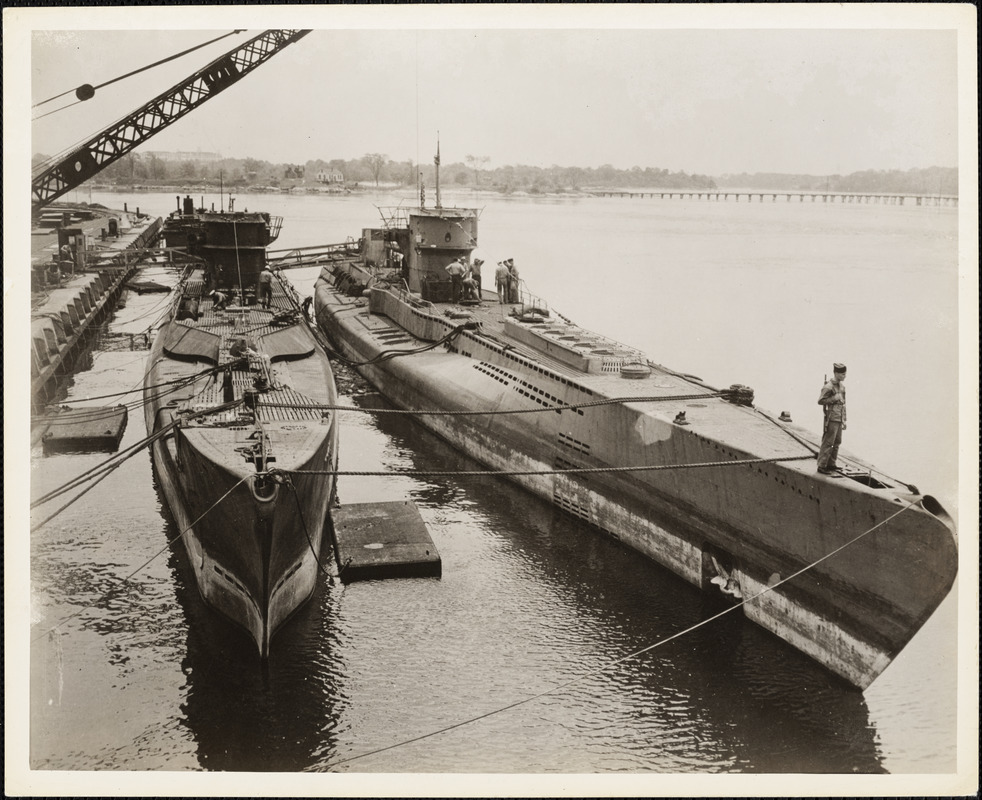
U-234 (right) being unloaded in Portsmouth

The fifth and sixth Type XB started their first patrol in the second half of 1943 : U-219 left Germany on 6 October on a mission to mine the harbor of Cape Town and then to proceed to the German U-boat base at Penang. Whilst refueling some U-boats around the Azores on her outward journey, she was damaged by aircraft and returned to France on 1 January 1944. U-220 left Norway on 6 September and laid a minefield off St. John's, Newfoundland and Labrador, on which two ships sank. She then continued towards the Azores where she was sunk on 28 October whilst refueling another U-boat.

The last pair of Type XB was to commence patrols in early 1944, but only U-233 started a patrol from Kiel on 27 May 1944 for a minelaying mission to Canada and to refuel U-boats in the central Atlantic. She was sunk on 28 October off Newfoundland and Labrador before reaching Canada. The construction of the eighth and last boat of the class, U-234, was much delayed, because of bomb damage caused by an air raid. Soon after the U-234 was commissioned on 2 March 1944, it was decided to convert her and the one other surviving Type XB U-219 to a transport U-boat. U-219 reached Batavia in December 1944 with a cargo for Japan. Following Germany's surrender, U-219 was seized by the Japanese at Batavia on 8 May 1945 and on 15 July 1945 was placed into service with the Imperial Japanese Navy as I-505. U-234 surrendered to US Navy ships on 14 May 1945 while en route for Japan with a cargo that included 560 kg (1,230 lb) of uranium oxide and a disassembled Me 262 jet fighter.

== List of Type X submarines ==
	Commissioned	Lost	Patrols	Fate
U-116	26 Jul 1941	6 Oct 1942	3	Disappeared in the North Atlantic and was presumed sunk.
U-117	25 Oct 1941	7 Aug 1943	4	Sunk in the North Atlantic by aircraft from USS Card.
U-118	6 Dec 1941	12 Jun 1943	4	Sunk near the Canary Islands by aircraft from USS Bogue.
U-119	2 Apr 1942	24 Jun 1943	2	Sunk in the Bay of Biscay by ramming and depth charges from HMS Starling.
U-219	12 Dec 1942	8 May 1945	2	Seized by the Japanese at Batavia. Placed into service On 15 July 1945 with the Imperial Japanese Navy as I-505. Captured by the Allies at Jakarta in August 1945 and scuttled South of Sunda strait on 3 February 1946.
U-220	22 Mar 1943	28 Oct 1943	1	Sunk in the North Atlantic by aircraft from USS Block Island.
U-233	22 Sept 1943	5 Jul 1944	1	Sunk southeast of Halifax, Nova Scotia by destroyer escorts USS Baker and USS Thomas.
U-234	2 Mar 1944	14 May 1945	1	Surrendered to US Navy ships at sea in May 1945. Scuttled on 20 November 1947.

== Bibliography ==
- Bagnasco, Erminio (1977). Submarines of World War Two. Annapolis: Naval Institute Press. ISBN 0870219626.
- Blair, Clay (1998). Hitler's U-Boat War: The Hunters 1939–1942. Vol. 1. Cassell. ISBN 0-304-35260-8.
- Blair, Clay (1998). Hitler's U-Boat War: The Hunted 1942–1945. Vol. 2. Cassell. ISBN 0-304-35261-6.
- Gröner, Erich; Jung, Dieter; Maass, Martin (1991). German Warships 1815–1945, U-boats and Mine Warfare Vessels. Vol. 2. Translated by Thomas, Keith; Magowan, Rachel. London: Conway Maritime Press. ISBN 0-85177-593-4.
- Herzog, Bodo (1993). Deutsche U-Boote: 1906−1966 [German U-boats: 1906−1966] (in German). Erlangen: Müller. ISBN 978-3-86070-036-5.
- Miller, David (2000). U-boats : history, development and equipment 1914-1945. London: Conway Maritime Press. ISBN 9780851777900.
- Möller, Eberhard; Brack, Werner (2004). The Encyclopedia of U-Boats: from 1904 to the present. London: Chatham. ISBN 978-1-85367-623-9.
- Rössler, Eberhard (1981). The U-boat: The evolution and technical history of German submarines. London: Cassell & Co. ISBN 0-304-36120-8.
- Williamson, Gordon (2005). Wolf Pack: The Story of the U-boat in World War II. Oxford: Osprey Publishing. ISBN 1-84176-872-3.

=== Online ===
- Helgason, Guðmundur. "The Type XB boat U-219". German U-boats of WWII - uboat.net.
- Helgason, Guðmundur. "The Type XB boat U-234". German U-boats of WWII - uboat.net.
