= German submarine U-180 =

German World War II submarine

Coordinates: 44.000°N 2.000°W

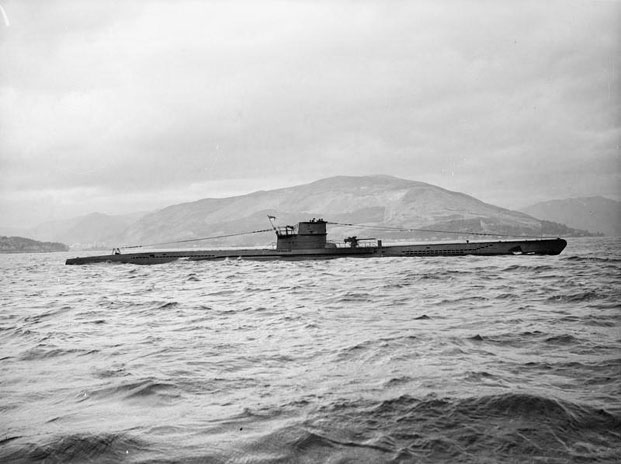

History

Nazi Germany
- Name: U-180
- Ordered: 28 May 1940
- Builder: DeSchiMAG AG Weser, Bremen
- Yard number: 1020
- Laid down: 25 February 1941
- Launched: 10 December 1941
- Commissioned: 16 May 1942
- Fate: Missing since 23 August 1944 in the Bay of Biscay off Bordeaux

General characteristics
- Class & type: Type IXD submarine
- Displacement: 1,610 t (1,580 long tons) surfaced; 1,799 t (1,771 long tons) submerged
- Length: 87.58 m (287 ft 4 in) o/a; 68.50 m (224 ft 9 in) pressure hull
- Beam: 7.50 m (24 ft 7 in) o/a; 4.40 m (14 ft 5 in) pressure hull
- Height: 10.20 m (33 ft 6 in)
- Draught: 5.35 m (17 ft 7 in)
- Installed power: 9,000 PS (6,600 kW; 8,900 bhp) (diesels); 1,000 PS (740 kW; 990 shp) (electric)
- Propulsion: 2 shafts; 2 × diesel engines; 2 × electric motors
- Speed: 20.8 knots (38.5 km/h; 23.9 mph) surfaced; 6.9 knots (12.8 km/h; 7.9 mph) submerged
- Range: 12,750 nmi (23,610 km; 14,670 mi) at 10 knots (19 km/h; 12 mph) surfaced; 213 nmi (394 km; 245 mi) at 4 knots (7.4 km/h; 4.6 mph) submerged
- Test depth: 230 m (750 ft)
- Complement: 55 to 63
- Armament: 6 × torpedo tubes (four bow, two stern); 24 × 53.3 cm (21 in) torpedoes (until 1943); 1 × 10.5 cm (4.1 in) SK C/32 deck gun (150 rounds); 1 × 3.7 cm (1.5 in) SK C/30 AA gun; 2 × 2 cm (0.79 in) C/30 anti-aircraft guns

Service record
- Part of: 4th U-boat Flotilla; 16 May 1942 - 31 January 1943; 12th U-boat Flotilla; 1 February - 1 November 1943; 1 April - 23 August 1944
- Identification codes: M 44 013
- Commanders: F.Kapt. Werner Musenberg; 16 May 1942 - 4 January 1944; Oblt.z.S.d.R. Harald Lange; October - 7 November 1943; Oblt.z.S. Rolf Riesen; 2 April - 23 August 1944
- Operations: 2 patrols: 1st patrol: 9 February - 3 July 1943; 2nd patrol: 20 – 23 August 1944
- Victories: 2 merchant ships sunk (13,298 GRT)

German submarine U-180 was a Type IXD1 transport U-boat of Nazi Germany's Kriegsmarine which served in World War II. Her keel was laid down on 25 February 1941 at the DeSchiMAG AG Weser yard in Bremen as yard number 1020. She was launched on 10 December 1941 and commissioned on 16 May 1942 under Fregattenkapitän Werner Musenberg (Crew 25). Stripped of torpedo armament, the Type IXD1s were designated as transport submarines, and could carry up to 252 tonnes of freight. U-180 was used primarily in clandestine operations.

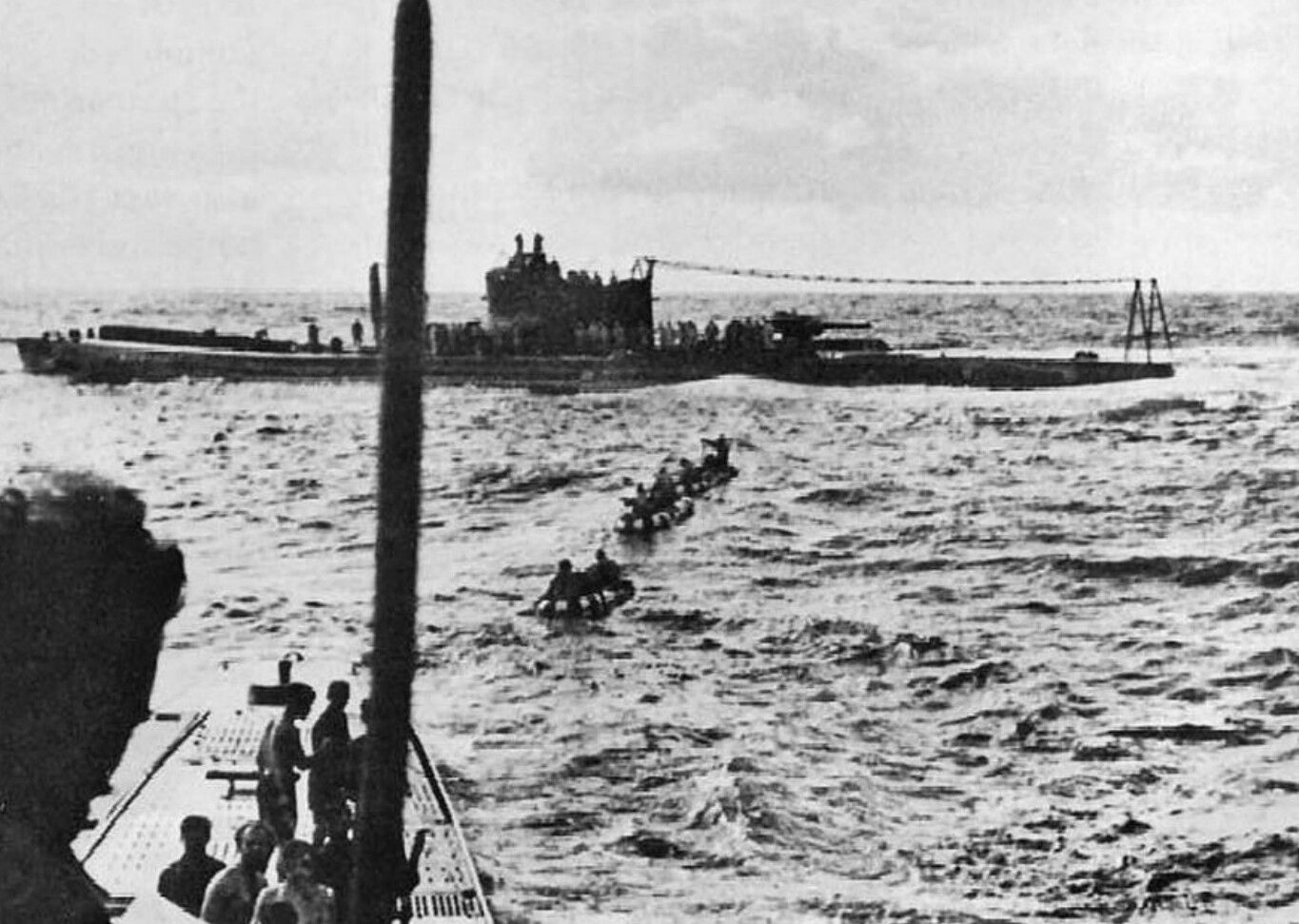
U-180 meeting with the Japanese submarine I-29, 27 April 1943

== Design ==
German Type IXD1 submarines were considerably larger than the original Type IXs. U-180 had a displacement of 1,610 tonnes (1,580 long tons) when at the surface and 1,799 tonnes (1,771 long tons) while submerged. The U-boat had a total length of 87.58 m (287 ft 4 in), a pressure hull length of 68.50 m (224 ft 9 in), a beam of 7.50 m (24 ft 7 in), a height of 10.20 m (33 ft 6 in), and a draught of 5.35 m (17 ft 7 in). The submarine was powered by two MAN M 9 V 40/46 supercharged four-stroke, nine-cylinder diesel engines plus two MWM RS34.5S six-cylinder four-stroke diesel engines for cruising, producing a total of 9,000 metric horsepower (6,620 kW; 8,880 shp) for use while surfaced, two Siemens-Schuckert 2 GU 345/34 double-acting electric motors producing a total of 1,000 shaft horsepower (1,010 PS; 750 kW) for use while submerged. She had two shafts and two 1.90 m (6 ft) propellers. The boat was capable of operating at depths of up to 200 metres (660 ft).

The submarine had a maximum surface speed of 20.8 knots (38.5 km/h; 23.9 mph) and a maximum submerged speed of 6.9 knots (12.8 km/h; 7.9 mph). When submerged, the boat could operate for 121 nautical miles (224 km; 139 mi) at 2 knots (3.7 km/h; 2.3 mph); when surfaced, she could travel 12,750 nautical miles (23,610 km; 14,670 mi) at 10 knots (19 km/h; 12 mph). U-180 was fitted with six 53.3 cm (21 in) torpedo tubes (four fitted at the bow and two at the stern), 24 torpedoes, one 10.5 cm (4.13 in) SK C/32 naval gun, 150 rounds, and a 3.7 cm (1.5 in) SK C/30 with 2575 rounds as well as two 2 cm (0.79 in) C/30 anti-aircraft guns with 8100 rounds. The boat had a complement of fifty-five.

== Service history ==
=== First patrol ===
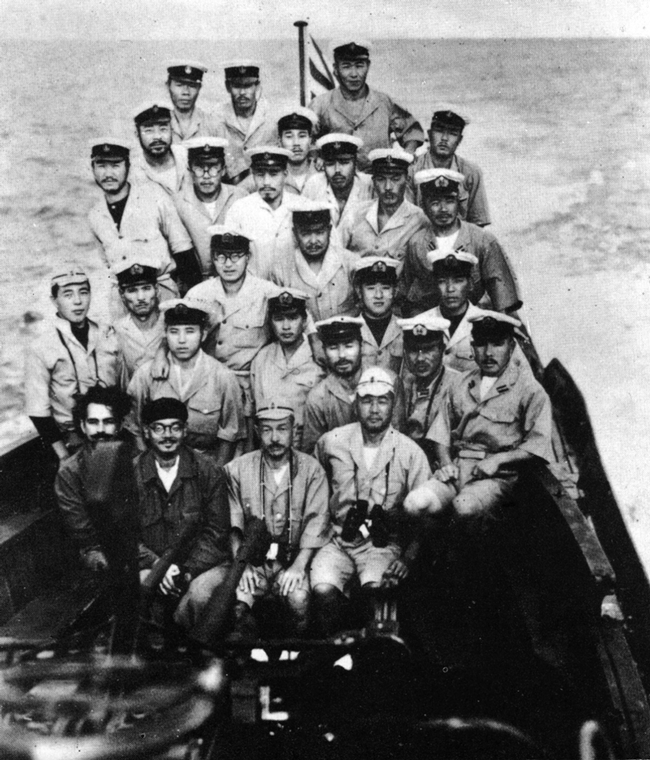
Netaji Subhas Chandra Bose (second from left in first row) and his adjutant, Abid Hasan (far left in first row), with the crew members of I-29 aboard her bridge after the exchange with U-180 on 28 April 1943.

U-180 sailed from Kiel on 8 February 1943, with the leader of the Indian National Army Netaji Subhas Chandra Bose and his aide Abid Hasan aboard.

On 18 April U-180 sank the British 8,132 GRT tanker Corbis about 500 nautical miles (930 km; 580 mi) east southeast of Port Elizabeth, South Africa. Nine days later, on 27 April, the boat made her rendezvous with the Imperial Japanese Navy I-29, just east of Madagascar in the Indian Ocean, Bose and Hassan boarded I-29 and two Japanese naval officers, both shipbuilding officers, Captains Emi Tetsushiro and Tomonaga Hideo, who were to study U-boat building techniques upon their arrival in Germany, boarded U-180. Bose and Hasan's transfer is the only known record of a civilian transfer between two submarines of two different navies in World War II. Also received were two tonnes of gold ingots as payment from Japan for weapons technology.

On the return voyage, U-180 sank the Greek freighter Boris west of Ascension Island on 3 June 1943.

During this voyage, U-180 was supplied by U-462 on the way to the exchange. She was supposed to be refueled by U-463 on the way back, but that boat was sunk by the British on 16 May 1943. On 19 June, U-180 was refueled by U-530.

=== Second patrol and loss ===
Under the command of Oberleutnant zur See Rolf Riesen (Crew 38), U-180 sailed from Bordeaux on 20 August 1944 bound for Japan. She was reported sunk off the Bay of Biscay on 23 August 1944, with the loss of all of her 56 crew. The official verdict is "sunk by a mine", however, some experts speculate that trouble with the schnorkel (the underwater breathing and engine operating device), may have been the cause.

== Summary of raiding history ==
Date	Ship	Nationality	Tonnage (GRT)	Fate
18 April 1943	Corbis	United Kingdom	8,132	Sunk
3 June 1943	Boris	Greece	5,166	Sunk

== Media ==
- U-180 is the submarine shown in the 2004 Bollywood film Netaji Subhas Chandra Bose: The Forgotten Hero where Netaji Subhas Chandra Bose travels with the German submarine U-180 around the Cape of Good Hope to the southeast of Madagascar, where he is transferred to the I-29 for the rest of the journey to Imperial Japan.
- U-180 is the submarine carrying Nazi party secretary, Martin Bormann, to South America in the Jack Higgins thriller, Thunder Point.
- U-180 is featured in the thriller Spook's Gold by Andrew Wood. The rendezvous on 21 April between U-180 and I-29, as well as an exchange of gold and military goods is a key element of the plot.

== Bibliography ==
- Busch, Rainer; Röll, Hans-Joachim (1999). German U-boat commanders of World War II : a biographical dictionary. Translated by Brooks, Geoffrey. London, Annapolis, Md: Greenhill Books, Naval Institute Press. ISBN 1-55750-186-6.
- Busch, Rainer; Röll, Hans-Joachim (1999). Deutsche U-Boot-Verluste von September 1939 bis Mai 1945 [German U-boat losses from September 1939 to May 1945]. Der U-Boot-Krieg (in German). Vol. IV. Hamburg, Berlin, Bonn: Mittler. ISBN 3-8132-0514-2.
- Gröner, Erich; Jung, Dieter; Maass, Martin (1991). U-boats and Mine Warfare Vessels. German Warships 1815–1945. Vol. 2. Translated by Thomas, Keith; Magowan, Rachel. London: Conway Maritime Press. ISBN 0-85177-593-4.
