= USS Barry =

Four ships of the United States Navy have been named Barry in honor of Commodore John Barry.

- USS Barry (DD-2), a Bainbridge-class destroyer, commissioned 1902, decommissioned 1919
- USS Barry (DD-248), a Clemson-class destroyer, commissioned 1920, sunk in action 1945
- USS Barry (DD-933), a Forrest Sherman-class destroyer, commissioned 1956, decommissioned 1982, museum ship 1984 - 2015, scrapped in 2021-2022
- USS Barry (DDG-52), an Arleigh Burke-class guided missile destroyer, commissioned 1992, in service as of 2025
