= German submarine U-281 =

German World War II submarine

Coordinates: 55°50′N 10°05′W

History

Nazi Germany
- Name: U-281
- Ordered: 5 June 1941
- Builder: Bremer Vulkan, Bremen-Vegesack
- Yard number: 46
- Laid down: 7 May 1942
- Launched: 16 January 1943
- Commissioned: 27 February 1943
- Fate: Surrendered at Kristiansand-Sud on 9 May 1945; Sunk on 30 November 1945 in Operation Deadlight

General characteristics
- Class & type: Type VIIC submarine
- Displacement: 769 tonnes (757 long tons) surfaced; 871 t (857 long tons) submerged
- Length: 67.10 m (220 ft 2 in) o/a; 50.50 m (165 ft 8 in) pressure hull
- Beam: 6.20 m (20 ft 4 in) o/a; 4.70 m (15 ft 5 in) pressure hull
- Height: 9.60 m (31 ft 6 in)
- Draught: 4.74 m (15 ft 7 in)
- Installed power: 2,800–3,200 PS (2,100–2,400 kW; 2,800–3,200 bhp) (diesels); 750 PS (550 kW; 740 shp) (electric)
- Propulsion: 2 shafts; 2 × diesel engines; 2 × electric motors
- Speed: 17.7 knots (32.8 km/h; 20.4 mph) surfaced; 7.6 knots (14.1 km/h; 8.7 mph) submerged
- Range: 8,500 nmi (15,700 km; 9,800 mi) at 10 knots (19 km/h; 12 mph) surfaced; 80 nmi (150 km; 92 mi) at 4 knots (7.4 km/h; 4.6 mph) submerged
- Test depth: 230 m (750 ft); Crush depth: 250–295 m (820–968 ft)
- Complement: 4 officers, 40–56 enlisted
- Armament: 5 × 53.3 cm (21 in) torpedo tubes (four bow, one stern); 14 × torpedoes or 26 TMA mines; 1 × 8.8 cm (3.46 in) deck gun (220 rounds); 2 × twin 2 cm (0.79 in) C/30 anti-aircraft guns

Service record
- Part of: 8th U-boat Flotilla; 27 February – 31 July 1943; 7th U-boat Flotilla; 1 August – 9 November 1944; 33rd U-boat Flotilla; 10 November 1944 – 8 May 1945
- Identification codes: M 50 190
- Commanders: Kptlt. Heinz von Davidson; 27 February 1943 – 9 May 1945
- Operations: 4 patrols: 1st patrol: 6 October – 26 November 1943; 2nd patrol: 5 January – 5 March 1944; 3rd patrol: a. 6 – 15 June 1944; b. 9 – 14 August 1944; 4th patrol: a. 4 September – 29 October 1944; b. 2 – 5 November 1944
- Victories: None

German submarine U-281 was a Type VIIC U-boat of Nazi Germany's Kriegsmarine during World War II.

The submarine was laid down on 7 May 1942 at the Bremer Vulkan yard at Bremen-Vegesack as yard number 46. She was launched on 16 January 1943 and commissioned on 27 February under the command of Kapitänleutnant Heinz von Davidson.

== Design ==
German Type VIIC submarines were preceded by the shorter Type VIIB submarines. U-281 had a displacement of 769 tonnes (757 long tons) when at the surface and 871 tonnes (857 long tons) while submerged. She had a total length of 67.10 m (220 ft 2 in), a pressure hull length of 50.50 m (165 ft 8 in), a beam of 6.20 m (20 ft 4 in), a height of 9.60 m (31 ft 6 in), and a draught of 4.74 m (15 ft 7 in). The submarine was powered by two Germaniawerft F46 four-stroke, six-cylinder supercharged diesel engines producing a total of 2,800 to 3,200 metric horsepower (2,060 to 2,350 kW; 2,760 to 3,160 shp) for use while surfaced, two AEG GU 460/8–27 double-acting electric motors producing a total of 750 metric horsepower (550 kW; 740 shp) for use while submerged. She had two shafts and two 1.23 m (4 ft) propellers. The boat was capable of operating at depths of up to 230 metres (750 ft).

The submarine had a maximum surface speed of 17.7 knots (32.8 km/h; 20.4 mph) and a maximum submerged speed of 7.6 knots (14.1 km/h; 8.7 mph). When submerged, the boat could operate for 80 nautical miles (150 km; 92 mi) at 4 knots (7.4 km/h; 4.6 mph); when surfaced, she could travel 8,500 nautical miles (15,700 km; 9,800 mi) at 10 knots (19 km/h; 12 mph). U-281 was fitted with five 53.3 cm (21 in) torpedo tubes (four fitted at the bow and one at the stern), fourteen torpedoes, one 8.8 cm (3.46 in) SK C/35 naval gun, 220 rounds, and two twin 2 cm (0.79 in) C/30 anti-aircraft guns. The boat had a complement of between forty-four and sixty.

== Service history ==
U-281 served with the 8th U-boat Flotilla for training from February to July 1943 and operationally with the 7th flotilla from 1 August. She carried out four patrols, but sank no ships. She was a member of 11 wolfpacks.

=== First patrol ===
After two short voyages in Norwegian waters, the boat headed for occupied France, departing Kiel on 6 October 1943, the 'long' way round the British Isles. She passed between Iceland and the Faroe Islands and into the Atlantic Ocean. She was attacked by a B-24 Liberator east of Cape Farewell (Greenland) on the 17th. The aircraft's depth charges fell short, but three men were wounded by machine gun fire. The submarine arrived at St. Nazaire on 26 November.

=== Second patrol ===
U-281's second patrol was to mid-Atlantic and at 61 days, was to be her longest.

=== Third patrol ===
By contrast, her third patrol was the shortest; she did not get out of the Bay of Biscay.

=== Return to Germany and surrender ===
She then made the short journey from St. Nazaire to La Pallice, further south along the French Atlantic coast in August 1944, before undertaking the longer voyage to Kristiansand in Norway, again negotiating the gap between Iceland and the Faroes, but in the other direction. She did not stay in Norway long, arriving at Flensburg on 5 November 1944.

The submarine surrendered at Kristiansand-Sud on 9 May 1945. She was transferred to Loch Ryan in Scotland via Scapa Flow for Operation Deadlight. She was sunk on 30 November 1945.

U-281 appears in the film The Cruel Sea after her surrender (approx 1 hour 57 minutes into the film).

=== Wolfpacks ===
U-281 took part in eleven wolfpacks, namely:

- Schlieffen (16 – 22 October 1943)
- Siegfried (22 – 27 October 1943)
- Siegfried 2 (27 – 30 October 1943)
- Körner (30 October – 2 November 1943)
- Tirpitz 3 (2 – 8 November 1943)
- Eisenhart 9 (9 – 11 November 1943)
- Rügen (14 – 26 January 1944)
- Hinein (26 January – 3 February 1944)
- Igel 2 (3 – 17 February 1944)
- Hai 2 (17 – 22 February 1944)
- Preussen (22 – 23 February 1944)

== Bibliography ==
- Busch, Rainer; Röll, Hans-Joachim (1999). German U-boat commanders of World War II : a biographical dictionary. Translated by Brooks, Geoffrey. London, Annapolis, Md: Greenhill Books, Naval Institute Press. ISBN 1-55750-186-6.
- Busch, Rainer; Röll, Hans-Joachim (1999). Der U-Boot-Krieg, 1939-1945: Deutsche U-Boot-Verluste von September 1939 bis Mai 1945 [German U-boat losses from September 1939 to May 1945] (in German). Vol. IV. Hamburg, Berlin, Bonn: Mittler. ISBN 3-8132-0514-2.
- Gröner, Erich; Jung, Dieter; Maass, Martin (1991). U-boats and Mine Warfare Vessels. German Warships 1815–1945. Vol. 2. Translated by Thomas, Keith; Magowan, Rachel. London: Conway Maritime Press. ISBN 0-85177-593-4.
