= Wolfpack Siegfried =

Siegfried was a "wolfpack" of German U-boats that operated during the battle of the Atlantic in World War II.

== Service history ==
Siegfried was formed in October 1943 to operate against the North Atlantic convoy routes and comprised 18 boats. It consisted of seven boats from the disbanded group Schlieffen, plus eleven others from bases in France and Germany. All the reinforcements were commanded by new skippers; six from Norway were also new boats, while the five from France were experienced boats with new commanders. The Siegfried boats had fuel problems, so a refuelling group was established north of the Azores, of three tankers and a flak boat as escort.

Siegfried was deployed to intercept east-bound convoys in mid-Atlantic, planning to attack while travelling towards the refuelling group and home bases in France. However the Allies became aware of Siegfried's position, and diverted their east-bound HX and SC convoys out of harm's way, leaving a massively reinforced west-bound convoy, ON 207 to run into Siegfried as bait. Three Siegfried boats were destroyed in engagements with ON 207's escorts (U-274, U-420, and U-282), while the refuelling group was attacked by USN hunter-killer groups centred on the escort carriers USS Block Island and Card. Two Siegfried boats (U-405 and U-584) and one tanker (U-220) were destroyed and the flak boat (U-256) was damaged and forced to return to base.

Siegfried was reconfigured after these actions to form three sub-groups (Siegfried 1-3) and spread a wider net; further rearrangements followed throughout November and December. None of these were successful, as the Allies were able to divert convoys around the patrol lines or steer through the gaps.

== U-boats involved ==
- U-91
- U-212
- U-226
- U-231
- U-267
- U-281
- U-309
- U-373
- U-405
- U-413
- U-426
- U-437
- U-552
- U-575
- U-592
- U-608
- U-648
- U-709
- U-762
- U-842
- U-963
- U-967
- U-969

Re-fueling group

- U-488 (U-tanker)
- U-219 (Type XB provisional tanker)
- U-220 (Type XB provisional tanker)
- U-256 (Flak boat)

== The name ==
Siegfried was named for the legendary German hero Siegfried whose story is told in the Nibelungenlied
