= Sea Rover =

Sea Rover may refer to:

- HMS Sea Rover (P218), a British Royal Navy submarine commissioned in 1943 and sold in 1949
- USS Sea Rover (AT-57), originally SP-1014, a United States Navy tugboat in commission from 1918 to 1921
