= Father of the American Navy =

The title "Father of the American Navy" may refer to:

- John Paul Jones, British-American naval officer who served in the Continental Navy during the American Revolutionary War
- John Barry (naval officer), Irish-born American naval officer who served in the Continental Navy during the American Revolutionary War and in the United States Navy during the Quasi-War
- John Adams, Founding Father and the second president of the United States
