= USS Goff =

Clemson-class destroyer

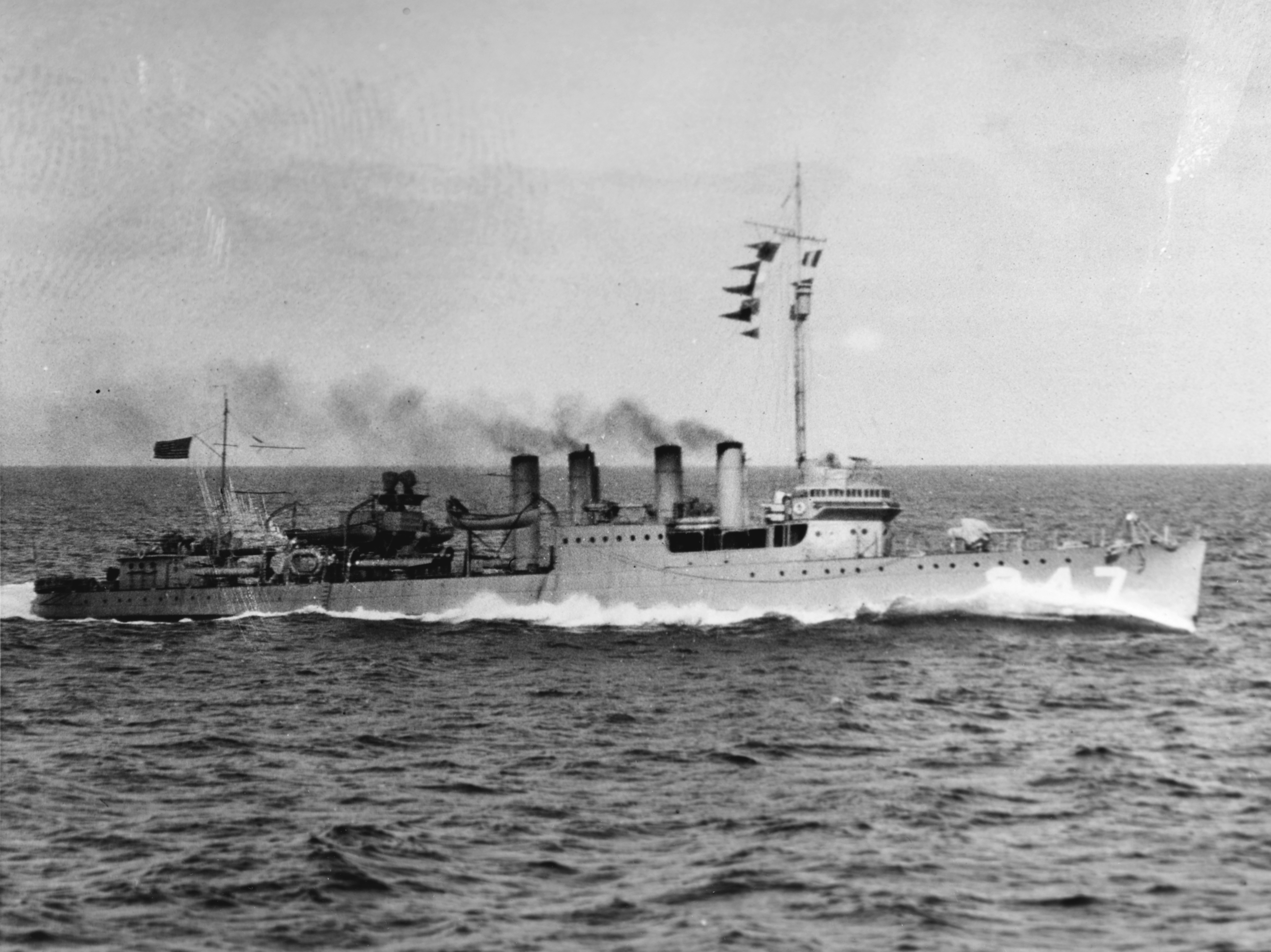
- USS Goff (DD-247) in March 1923

History

United States
- Name: USS Goff
- Namesake: Nathan Goff, Jr. (1843–1920), 28th U.S. Secretary of the Navy (1881)
- Builder: New York Shipbuilding
- Laid down: 16 June 1919
- Launched: 2 June 1920
- Sponsored by: Mrs. Nathan Goff
- Commissioned: 19 January 1921
- Decommissioned: 13 January 1931
- Recommissioned: 2 March 1932
- Decommissioned: 21 July 1945
- Stricken: 13 August 1945
- Fate: Sold 30 November 1945; Scrapped November 1947

General characteristics
- Class & type: Clemson-class destroyer
- Displacement: 1,216 tons
- Length: 314 feet 4 inches (95.81 m)
- Beam: 31 feet 8 inches (9.65 m)
- Draft: 9 feet 10 inches (3.00 m)
- Propulsion: 26,500 shp (20 MW); geared turbines, 2 screws
- Speed: 35 knots (65 km/h)
- Range: 4,900 nm @ 15 kn (9,100 km @ 28 km/h)
- Complement: 137 officers and enlisted
- Armament: 4 x 4 in (100 mm) guns, 1 x 3 in (76 mm) gun, 12 x 21 inch (533 mm) tt.

USS Goff (DD-247) was a United States Navy Clemson-class destroyer in commission from 1921 to 1931 and from 1932 to 1945. She saw service during the Second Nicaraguan Campaign and World War II. She was named for Secretary of the Navy Nathan Goff, Jr.

== Construction and commissioning ==
Goff was built by the New York Shipbuilding Corporation. Laid down on 16 June 1919, she was launched on 2 June 1920, sponsored by Mrs. Nathan Goff, widow of the former Secretary of the Navy. Goff was commissioned at the Philadelphia Navy Yard on League Island in Philadelphia, Pennsylvania, on 19 January 1921.

== Service history ==
=== 1921–1931 ===
For the first two years of her service, Goff operated along the United States East Coast, conducting battle practice and exercises in the yearly Caribbean fleet maneuvers as well as off the U.S. East Coast. In September 1922, she was detached from this duty and assigned to the United States Atlantic Fleet, European Waters. Departing Norfolk, Virginia, on 14 October 1922, she cruised primarily in the Eastern Mediterranean, putting in at ports in Turkey, Bulgaria, Russia, Egypt, Palestine, Syria, Greece, and Romania. It was a period of great unrest in the Balkans and eastern Mediterranean: Greece and Turkey were at war, various powers were scrambling to consolidate after World War I and gain control over the now-defunct Ottoman Empire, and Russia, although still wracked by the Russian Civil War and its aftermath, was seeking further territory and an outlet to the Mediterranean Sea. The presence of U.S. Navy warships amidst this tension assisted various relief agencies working to mitigate the damage from past and present wars as well as protect American lives, interests, and property. U.S. Navy vessels frequently evacuated and cared for refugees from the Greco-Turkish War, and Goff participated in this humanitarian service, particularly at Marsina, where from 18 to 20 July 1923 she supervised the evacuation of hundreds of Turkish refugees.

Returning to the United States on 11 August 1923, Goff engaged in battle problems and tactical exercises off the U.S. East Coast and then on 3 January 1924 joined the Scouting Fleet for winter battle practice with the combined fleets in the Caribbean. Goff returned to Norfolk, Virginia, for further exercises and on 5 January 1925 departed for Pearl Harbor, Hawaii, arriving there on 24 April 1925 for fleet battle exercises. She arrived at New York City 17 July 1925. This established pattern of coastwise exercises and fleet maneuvers was broken in the fall of 1926, as Goff and the light cruiser USS Milwaukee (CL-5) engaged in rescue work on the Isle of Pines off Cuba, which had been devastated by the 1926 Havana–Bermuda hurricane of 19–20 October 1926. Flying in stores via Milwaukee's floatplanes and sending their own doctors and medical supplies ashore, the two American ships gave aid to the stricken island and its predominantly American population.

After overhaul, Goff returned to the Caribbean in January 1927 with the Special Service Squadron. Civil war was underway in Nicaragua, and ships of the American fleet cruised along the Nicaraguan coast to protect American lives and property and to evacuate American citizens if necessary. From Nicaragua, Goff returned to her regular routine along the U.S. East Coast, tactical exercises spiced by winter maneuvers in the Caribbean, a pattern to which she held for several years.

Goff′s routine was interrupted by occasional special tasks, the most notable of which came in June 1927, when Goff was part of the flotilla which steamed out from the U.S. East Coast to greet and escort the light cruiser USS Memphis and her special passenger, Charles Lindbergh, as he returned from his transatlantic flight — history's first such solo flight — to a hero's welcome in New York City. In June 1930, Goff carried the president-elect of Colombia, Enrique Olaya Herrera, from Newport, Rhode Island, to West Point, New York. She decommissioned at the Philadelphia Navy Yard on 13 January 1931.

=== 1932–1941 ===
Recommissioning 2 March 1932 Goff spent the following year cruising along the U.S. East Coast training United States Naval Reserve crews. Goff returned to the Caribbean on 5 October 1933 to protect Americans in Cuba, where a revolution had broken out. Departing Cuba on 2 April 1934, Goff resumed maneuvers along the U.S. East Coast until 9 November 1935, when she joined the United States Pacific Fleet at San Diego, California. She remained in the Pacific, operating along the United States West Coast and taking part in exercises in Hawaii until 4 January 1939, when she departed San Diego for New York City. Arriving there on 20 April 1939, Goff again cruised the U.S. East Coast training Naval Reserve personnel until 8 September 1939, when she entered New England waters to serve on the Neutrality Patrol.

After overhaul and refitting for European duty at New York, Goff joined Destroyer Division 55 at Ponta Delgada in the Azores on 29 June 1940 to take her place as flagship of the division. Cruising to Portugal, Goff and her division operated from Lisbon, engaging in various exercises before returning to Norfolk on 21 September 1940.

Joining Destroyer Division 67 as its flagship, Goff escorted the submarine USS Seawolf (SS-197) from New London, Connecticut, to Balboa in the Panama Canal Zone, arriving there on 31 October 1940 to take up Caribbean patrol and guard duty for the Panama Canal.

=== World War II ===
The United States entered World War II on 7 December 1941 with the Japanese attack on Pearl Harbor. Goff remained in the Caribbean to do double duty as both a convoy escort and patrol vessel. The area was heavily trafficked by German U-boats, and the undermanned Allied convoys (each of which consisted of as many as 25 merchant ships with only four escorts) frequently provided easy targets. Night attacks by German submarines cost convoys which Goff was escorting a total of eight merchant ships sunk and several others seriously damaged. Goff was out on patrol and convoy duty 10 days at a time and then in port only long enough to refuel and resupply; when this could be done at sea, it was. Escorts were at a premium as the Allies struggled to maintain their supply lines. Goff left the Caribbean on 16 June 1943 and put in at New York City for a long-needed overhaul.

Goff finally had her chance to inflict real damage on the German U-boats when at Norfolk, Virginia, on 27 July 1943 she joined the escort aircraft carrier USS Card (CVE-11) and the destroyers USS Barry (DD-248) and USS Borie (DD-215) to form an offensive antisubmarine patrol which conducted two highly successful patrols across the Atlantic Ocean. The close coordination between Card′s planes and her destroyer screen was effective. During the period Goff was with Card, from 27 July to 9 November 1943, the ships made two voyages from Norfolk to Casablanca, French Morocco, and were credited with sinking no fewer than eight U-boats. These patrols came to a dramatic conclusion when on 1 November 1943 Borie rammed and sunk the German submarine U-405, but was herself fatally damaged in the process. For these two patrols Goff was awarded a Presidential Unit Citation.

After a brief overhaul at New York City, Goff returned to Atlantic escort duty as on 28 November 1943. She and Barry convoyed the seaplane tender USS Albemarle (AV-5), loaded with aeronautical supplies and personnel, from Norfolk to Casablanca and then on to Reykjavík, Iceland, returning to New York City on 31 December 1943. Goff spent the first seven months of 1944 with Albemarle, shepherding the seaplane tender safely to San Juan, Trinidad; Casablanca; Recife, Brazil; and Avonmouth, England, before putting in at Boston, Massachusetts, on 13 July 1944 for overhaul.

Repairs completed, Goff engaged in antisubmarine practice at Casco Bay, Maine, and then on 28 August 1944 departed for Key West, Florida, arriving there on 31 August 1944. At Key West, she was attached to the Fleet Sound School and served in a variety of duties, including antisubmarine work, harbor guard, and target vessel for ships and planes in training. World War II ended in Europe on 8 May 1945, and she departed Key West for Philadelphia on 9 June 1945, arriving there on 11 June 1945.

== Decommissioning and disposal ==
Goff decommissioned at Philadelphia on 21 July 1945, after 24 years of service, and was struck from the Navy Register on 13 August 1945. Sold to the Boston Metal Salvage Company of Baltimore, Maryland, on 30 November 1945, she was resold to the Northern Metal Company of Philadelphia on 31 December 1945 and scrapped in November 1947.

== Honors and awards ==
- Presidential Unit Citation
- Second Nicaraguan Campaign Medal
- American Campaign Medal with one battle star
- European–African–Middle Eastern Campaign Medal with one battle star
- World War II Victory Medal

Goff received two battle stars for service in World War II, for the periods 27 July–10 September 1943 and 25 September–19 November 1943.
