= German submarine U-963 =

German World War II submarine

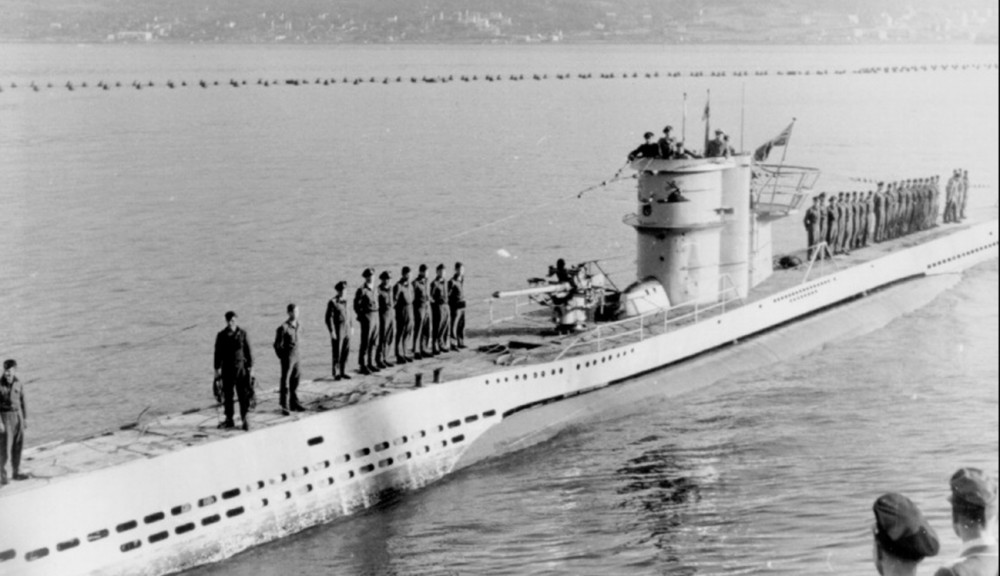
- U-963's crew formed up on deck.

History

Nazi Germany
- Name: U-963
- Ordered: 5 June 1941
- Builder: Blohm & Voss, Hamburg
- Yard number: 163
- Laid down: 20 April 1942
- Launched: 30 December 1942
- Commissioned: 17 February 1943
- Fate: Scuttled on 20 May 1945

General characteristics
- Class & type: Type VIIC submarine
- Displacement: 769 tonnes (757 long tons) surfaced; 871 t (857 long tons) submerged
- Length: 67.10 m (220 ft 2 in) o/a; 50.50 m (165 ft 8 in) pressure hull
- Beam: 6.20 m (20 ft 4 in) o/a; 4.70 m (15 ft 5 in) pressure hull
- Height: 9.60 m (31 ft 6 in)
- Draught: 4.74 m (15 ft 7 in)
- Installed power: 2,800–3,200 PS (2,100–2,400 kW; 2,800–3,200 bhp) (diesels); 750 PS (550 kW; 740 shp) (electric)
- Propulsion: 2 shafts; 2 × diesel engines; 2 × electric motors
- Speed: 17.7 knots (32.8 km/h; 20.4 mph) surfaced; 7.6 knots (14.1 km/h; 8.7 mph) submerged
- Range: 8,500 nmi (15,700 km; 9,800 mi) at 10 knots (19 km/h; 12 mph) surfaced; 80 nmi (150 km; 92 mi) at 4 knots (7.4 km/h; 4.6 mph) submerged
- Test depth: 220 m (720 ft); Crush depth: 250–295 m (820–968 ft)
- Complement: 4 officers, 44–52 enlisted
- Armament: 5 × 53.3 cm (21 in) torpedo tubes (four bow, one stern); 14 × torpedoes or; 26 TMA mines; 1 × 8.8 cm (3.46 in) deck gun (220 rounds); 1 × twin 2 cm (0.79 in) C/30 anti-aircraft gun

Service record
- Part of: 5th U-boat Flotilla; 17 February – 31 July 1943; 1st U-boat Flotilla; 1 August 1943 – 31 October 1944; 11th U-boat Flotilla; 1 November 1944 – 8 May 1945
- Identification codes: M 50 702
- Commanders: Lt.z.S. / Oblt.z.S. Karl Boddenberg; 17 February 1943 – December 1944; Oblt.z.S. Werner Müller; 13 – 21 August 1944; Oblt.z.S. Rolf-Werner Wentz; December 1944 – 20 May 1945
- Operations: 10 patrols: 1st patrol: 4 – 18 September 1943; 2nd patrol: 5 October – 3 December 1943; 3rd patrol: a. 23 – 24 January 1944; b. 26 January – 27 March 1944; 4th patrol: 6 – 8 June 1944; 5th patrol: 11 – 13 July 1944; 6th patrol: 17 – 19 July 1944; 7th patrol: 13 – 21 August 1944; 8th patrol: 29 August – 7 October 1944; 9th patrol: 16 January – 6 March 1945; 10th patrol: 23 April – 20 May 1945
- Victories: None

German submarine U-963 was a Type VIIC U-boat of Nazi Germany's Kriegsmarine during World War II.

She was ordered on 5 June 1941, and was laid down on 20 April 1942 at Blohm & Voss, Hamburg, as yard number 163. She was launched on 30 December 1942 and commissioned under the command of Leutnant zur See Karl Boddenberg on 17 February 1943.

== Design ==
German Type VIIC submarines were preceded by the shorter Type VIIB submarines. U-963 had a displacement of 769 tonnes (757 long tons) when at the surface and 871 tonnes (857 long tons) while submerged. She had a total length of 67.10 m (220 ft 2 in), a pressure hull length of 50.50 m (165 ft 8 in), a beam of 6.20 m (20 ft 4 in), a height of 9.60 m (31 ft 6 in), and a draught of 4.74 m (15 ft 7 in). The submarine was powered by two Germaniawerft F46 four-stroke, six-cylinder supercharged diesel engines producing a total of 2,800 to 3,200 metric horsepower (2,060 to 2,350 kW; 2,760 to 3,160 shp) for use while surfaced, two Garbe, Lahmeyer & Co. RP 137/c double-acting electric motors producing a total of 750 metric horsepower (550 kW; 740 shp) for use while submerged. She had two shafts and two 1.23 m (4 ft) propellers. The boat was capable of operating at depths of up to 230 metres (750 ft).

The submarine had a maximum surface speed of 17.7 knots (32.8 km/h; 20.4 mph) and a maximum submerged speed of 7.6 knots (14.1 km/h; 8.7 mph). When submerged, the boat could operate for 80 nautical miles (150 km; 92 mi) at 4 knots (7.4 km/h; 4.6 mph); when surfaced, she could travel 8,500 nautical miles (15,700 km; 9,800 mi) at 10 knots (19 km/h; 12 mph). U-963 was fitted with five 53.3 cm (21 in) torpedo tubes (four fitted at the bow and one at the stern), fourteen torpedoes or 26 TMA mines, one 8.8 cm (3.46 in) SK C/35 naval gun, 220 rounds, and one twin 2 cm (0.79 in) C/30 anti-aircraft gun. The boat had a complement of between 44 — 52 men.

== Service history ==
U-963 had a recorded five attacks on her. The first two were during her fourth war patrol. On 5 February 1944, when she shot down a British B-24 Liberator of 53 Squadron/T RAF. Then on 26 March 1944, off Brest, France, she came under attack by an unidentified Allied airplane. This attack left nine men wounded; two of them badly. U-963 docked at Brest the next day.

Shortly after U-963 left Brest on 7 June 1944, on her fifth war patrol, she came under attack by another British B-24 of 53 Squadron RAF, piloted by John William Carmichael. The bomber was able to damage U-963 so severely that she had to return to Brest less than 24 hours after leaving for her patrol.

On 12 August 1944, the submarine base in Brest was bombed, killing one man during the air raid and severely wounding another, who died the next day.

The last attack came on 21 August 1944, in the Bay of Biscay. Just after midnight U-963 was forced into a crash dive and one man was lost overboard.

On 20 May 1945, the crew of U-963 scuttled her off Nazaré, Portugal. The entire crew survived.

The wreck is located at 39°36′N 09°05′W.

=== Wolfpacks ===
U-963 took part in eight wolfpacks, namely:

- Siegfried (22 – 27 October 1943)
- Siegfried 2 (27 – 30 October 1943)
- Körner (30 October 1943 – 2 November 1943)
- Tirpitz 2 (2 – 8 November 1943)
- Eisenhart 5 (9 – 15 November 1943)
- Igel 2 (3 – 17 February 1944)
- Hai 2 (17 – 22 February 1944)
- Preussen (22 February – 14 March 1944)

== Bibliography ==
- Busch, Rainer; Röll, Hans-Joachim (1999). German U-boat commanders of World War II : a biographical dictionary. Translated by Brooks, Geoffrey. London, Annapolis, Md: Greenhill Books, Naval Institute Press. ISBN 1-55750-186-6.
- Busch, Rainer; Röll, Hans-Joachim (1999). Deutsche U-Boot-Verluste von September 1939 bis Mai 1945 [German U-boat losses from September 1939 to May 1945]. Der U-Boot-Krieg (in German). Vol. IV. Hamburg, Berlin, Bonn: Mittler. ISBN 3-8132-0514-2.
- Gröner, Erich; Jung, Dieter; Maass, Martin (1991). German Warships 1815–1945, U-boats and Mine Warfare Vessels. Vol. 2. Translated by Thomas, Keith; Magowan, Rachel. London: Conway Maritime Press. ISBN 0-85177-593-4.
