= German submarine U-373 =

German world war II submarine

History

Nazi Germany
- Name: U-373
- Ordered: 23 September 1939
- Builder: Howaldtswerke, Kiel
- Yard number: 4
- Laid down: 8 December 1939
- Launched: 5 April 1941
- Commissioned: 22 May 1941
- Fate: Sunk on 8 June 1944

General characteristics
- Class & type: Type VIIC submarine
- Displacement: 769 tonnes (757 long tons) surfaced; 871 t (857 long tons) submerged
- Length: 67.10 m (220 ft 2 in) o/a; 50.50 m (165 ft 8 in) pressure hull
- Beam: 6.20 m (20 ft 4 in) o/a; 4.70 m (15 ft 5 in) pressure hull
- Height: 9.60 m (31 ft 6 in)
- Draught: 4.74 m (15 ft 7 in)
- Installed power: 2,800–3,200 PS (2,100–2,400 kW; 2,800–3,200 bhp) (diesels); 750 PS (550 kW; 740 shp) (electric)
- Propulsion: 2 shafts; 2 × diesel engines; 2 × electric motors
- Speed: 17.7 knots (32.8 km/h; 20.4 mph) surfaced; 7.6 knots (14.1 km/h; 8.7 mph) submerged
- Range: 8,500 nmi (15,700 km; 9,800 mi) at 10 knots (19 km/h; 12 mph) surfaced; 80 nmi (150 km; 92 mi) at 4 knots (7.4 km/h; 4.6 mph) submerged
- Test depth: 230 m (750 ft); Crush depth: 250–295 m (820–968 ft)
- Complement: 4 officers, 40–56 enlisted
- Armament: 5 × 53.3 cm (21 in) torpedo tubes (four bow, one stern); 14 × torpedoes or 26 TMA mines; 1 × 8.8 cm (3.46 in) deck gun (220 rounds); 1 x 2 cm (0.79 in) C/30 AA gun

Service record
- Part of: 3rd U-boat Flotilla; 22 May 1941 – 8 June 1944
- Identification codes: M 43 458
- Commanders: Kptlt. Paul-Karl Loeser; 22 May 1941 – 25 September 1943; Oblt.z.S. Detlef von Lehsten; 26 September 1943 – 8 June 1944
- Operations: 13 patrols: 1st patrol: 4 September – 2 October 1941; 2nd patrol: 31 October – 21 November 1941; 3rd patrol: 25 December 1941 – 15 January 1942; 4th patrol: a. 25 – 26 February 1942; b. 1 March – 17 April 1942; 5th patrol: 18 May – 8 July 1942; 6th patrol: 6 August – 4 October 1942; 7th patrol: 22 November 1942 – 3 January 1943; 8th patrol: 25 February – 13 April 1943; 9th patrol: 7 July – 16 August 1943; 10th patrol: a. 27 – 29 September 1943; b. 2 – 4 October 1943; c. 6 October – 26 November 1943; 11th patrol: a. 26 – 28 December 1943; b. 1 – 5 January 1944; 12th patrol: 16 – 18 March 1944; 13th patrol: 7 – 8 June 1944
- Victories: 3 merchants ships sunk (10,263 GRT)

German submarine U-373 was a Type VIIC U-boat of Nazi Germany's Kriegsmarine during World War II.

She carried out thirteen patrols before being sunk by a British aircraft on 8 June 1944 in the Bay of Biscay.

She sank three ships for a total of 10,263 gross register tons (GRT).

== Design ==
German Type VIIC submarines were preceded by the shorter Type VIIB submarines. U-373 had a displacement of 769 tonnes (757 long tons) when at the surface and 871 tonnes (857 long tons) while submerged. She had a total length of 67.10 m (220 ft 2 in), a pressure hull length of 50.50 m (165 ft 8 in), a beam of 6.20 m (20 ft 4 in), a height of 9.60 m (31 ft 6 in), and a draught of 4.74 m (15 ft 7 in). The submarine was powered by two Germaniawerft F46 four-stroke, six-cylinder supercharged diesel engines producing a total of 2,800 to 3,200 metric horsepower (2,060 to 2,350 kW; 2,760 to 3,160 shp) for use while surfaced, two AEG GU 460/8–27 double-acting electric motors producing a total of 750 metric horsepower (550 kW; 740 shp) for use while submerged. She had two shafts and two 1.23 m (4 ft) propellers. The boat was capable of operating at depths of up to 230 metres (750 ft).

The submarine had a maximum surface speed of 17.7 knots (32.8 km/h; 20.4 mph) and a maximum submerged speed of 7.6 knots (14.1 km/h; 8.7 mph). When submerged, the boat could operate for 80 nautical miles (150 km; 92 mi) at 4 knots (7.4 km/h; 4.6 mph); when surfaced, she could travel 8,500 nautical miles (15,700 km; 9,800 mi) at 10 knots (19 km/h; 12 mph). U-373 was fitted with five 53.3 cm (21 in) torpedo tubes (four fitted at the bow and one at the stern), fourteen torpedoes, one 8.8 cm (3.46 in) SK C/35 naval gun, 220 rounds, and a 2 cm (0.79 in) C/30 anti-aircraft gun. The boat had a complement of between forty-four and sixty.

== Service history ==
The submarine was laid down on 8 December 1939 at the Howaldtswerke at Kiel as yard number 3, launched on 5 April 1941 and commissioned on 22 May under the command of Kapitänleutnant Paul-Karl Loeser.

=== First patrol ===
The boat's first patrol was preceded by short trips between Kiel in Germany and Horten Naval Base and Trondheim in Norway in July and August 1941. Her first patrol proper commenced with her departure from Trondheim on 4 September. Negotiation of the gap separating Iceland and the Faroe Islands was followed by sweeps southeast of Greenland. The submarine then docked at Brest in occupied France on 2 October.

=== Second to fifth patrols ===
U-373's initial patrols were fairly routine. All that changed on the second part of her fourth sortie when she sank the Mount Lycabettus off the eastern United States/Canadian coast on 17 March 1942. She was chartered by Switzerland and was sailing with neutrality mark: Switzerland cross painting with "Switzerland" written on the hull. On the 22nd, she sank the Thursobank east of Chesapeake Bay. The surviving Chinese crewmen from this ship were arrested for mutiny immediately after landing. It was alleged that they had denied the British officers a share of the food and warm clothing.

She then sank the John R. Williams on 26 June 1942 with a mine laid on the 11th off Cape May.

=== Sixth, seventh and eighth patrols ===
U-373 was unsuccessfully attacked by HNoMS Acanthus in mid-Atlantic on 25 August 1942. The Norwegian corvette dropped five depth charges, but the U-boat was not damaged.

The boat's seventh foray was uneventful, but on her eighth she was bombed by a B-24 Liberator of the USAAF on 2 March 1943. Damage was moderate; after repairs, U-373 continued with her patrol.

=== Ninth patrol ===
On 24 July 1943, the submarine was attacked west of Madeira by Grumman Avenger and Wildcat aircraft from the escort carrier USS Santee. Two men were killed, another seven were wounded. The boat was damaged by a FIDO homing torpedo, but was able to carry-on with her patrol.

=== 10th and 11th patrols ===
During the third part of a three-part patrol on 10 November 1943, a lookout broke his arm while the submarine fought bad weather.

U-373 had a lucky escape when she was attacked by a British Vickers Wellington of No. 612 Squadron RAF on 3 January 1944 in the Bay of Biscay. A second aircraft, a Liberator of 224 Squadron joined in. On tying up in Brest, two unexploded depth charges were discovered lodged in the conning tower. The boat was compelled to put to sea once more to jettison her unwanted extra 'cargo' in another hazardous operation.

=== 12th and 13th patrols and loss ===
The boat left Brest for the last time on 7 June 1944. The following day, she was sunk by a RAF Liberator bomber of 224 Squadron in the Bay of Biscay. The Liberator than strafed several dinghies with floating survivors, killing Bootsmannsmaat Nielsen. Author Norman Franks writes “it was not unheard of for survivors to be shot-up in the water, although thankfully it was rare, or at least very few reported doing so - officially. In most cases it was no more than excited enthusiasm, the adrenalin pumping hard.” The same aircraft sank U-441 20 minutes later.

Four men died in U-373; there were 47 survivors.

=== Wolfpacks ===
U-373 took part in 16 wolfpacks, namely:

- Markgraf (8 – 15 September 1941)
- Brandenburg (15 – 24 September 1941)
- Störtebecker (5 – 16 November 1941)
- Seydlitz (27 December 1941 – 2 January 1942)
- Lohs (11 August – 21 September 1942)
- Draufgänger (29 November – 2 December 1942)
- Büffel (9 – 15 December 1942)
- Ungestüm (15 – 26 December 1942)
- Neuland (4 – 13 March 1943)
- Dränger (14 – 20 March 1943)
- Seewolf (21 – 28 March 1943)
- Siegfried (22 – 27 October 1943)
- Siegfried 3 (27 – 30 October 1943)
- Jahn (30 October – 2 November 1943)
- Tirpitz 5 (2 – 8 November 1943)
- Eisenhart 8 (9 – 10 November 1943)

== Summary of raiding history ==
Date	Ship Name	Nationality	Tonnage (GRT)	Fate
17 March 1942	Mount Lycabettus	Greece	4,292	Sunk
22 March 1942	Thursobank	United Kingdom	5,575	Sunk
24 June 1942	John R. Williams	United States	396	Sunk (Mine)

== Bibliography ==
- Busch, Rainer; Röll, Hans-Joachim (1999). German U-boat commanders of World War II : a biographical dictionary. Translated by Brooks, Geoffrey. London, Annapolis, Md: Greenhill Books, Naval Institute Press. ISBN 1-55750-186-6.
- Busch, Rainer; Röll, Hans-Joachim (1999). Deutsche U-Boot-Verluste von September 1939 bis Mai 1945 [German U-boat losses from September 1939 to May 1945]. Der U-Boot-Krieg (in German). Vol. IV. Hamburg, Berlin, Bonn: Mittler. ISBN 3-8132-0514-2.
- Gröner, Erich; Jung, Dieter; Maass, Martin (1991). U-boats and Mine Warfare Vessels. German Warships 1815–1945. Vol. 2. Translated by Thomas, Keith; Magowan, Rachel. London: Conway Maritime Press. ISBN 0-85177-593-4.
- Kemp, Paul (1999). U-Boats Destroyed – German Submarine Losses in the World Wars. London: Arms & Armour. ISBN 1-85409-515-3.
