= Commodore Barry Park =

Public park in Brooklyn, New York

Coordinates: 40°41′50″N 73°58′46″W

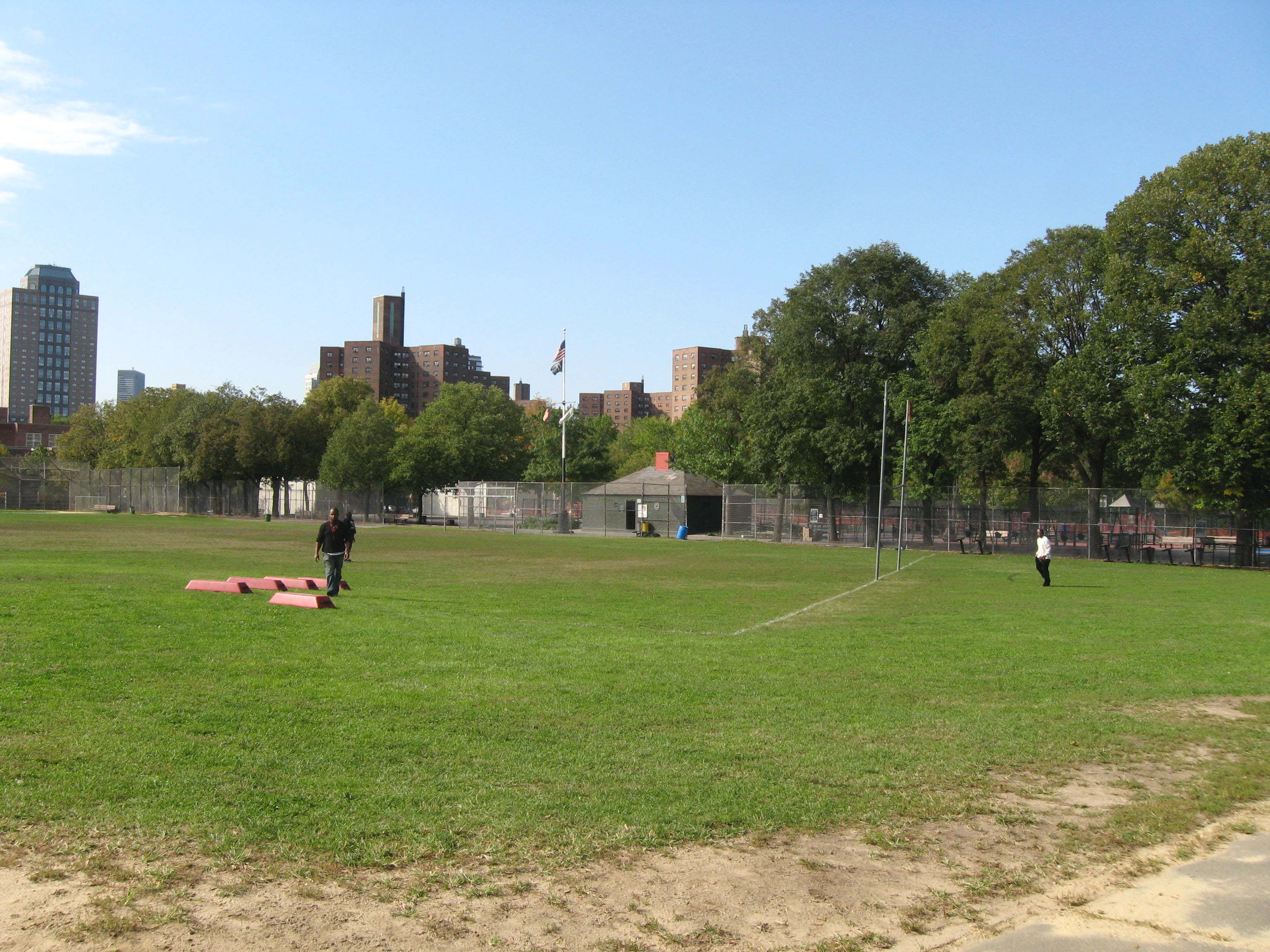
Playing field

Commodore Barry Park is an urban park in the Fort Greene neighborhood of the New York City borough of Brooklyn. The park is operated by the New York City Department of Parks and Recreation. It encompasses an area of 10.39 acres (42,000 m^{2}) and holds baseball, basketball, football, swimming pool and playground fields/facilities. The park was acquired in 1836 by the Village of Brooklyn (long before it was absorbed into New York City). When first acquired, it was called "City Park". It is the oldest park in the borough, and it was named for Commodore John Barry in 1951 due to its location next to the Brooklyn Navy Yard that Barry helped found.
