= USS Borie (DD-215) =

Clemson-class destroyer

Coordinates: 50°12′N 30°48′W

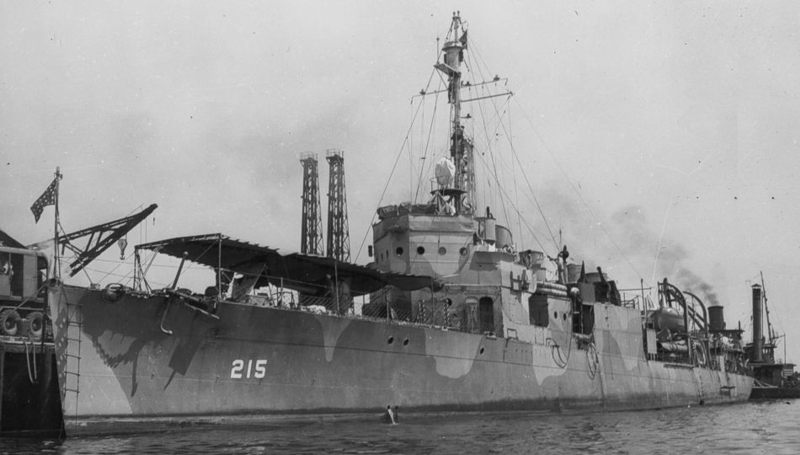
- USS Borie (DD-215), 1942.

History

United States
- Name: Borie
- Namesake: Adolph E. Borie
- Builder: William Cramp & Sons, Philadelphia
- Cost: $892,847 (hull & machinery)
- Yard number: 481
- Laid down: 30 April 1919
- Launched: 4 October 1919
- Commissioned: 24 March 1920
- Fate: Scuttled in the North Atlantic 2 November 1943

General characteristics
- Class & type: Clemson-class destroyer
- Displacement: 1,215 long tons (1,234 t)
- Length: 314 ft 4 in (95.8 m)
- Beam: 31 ft 9 in (9.7 m)
- Draft: 9 ft 10 in (3.0 m)
- Propulsion: 26,500 shp (19,761 kW); Geared turbines; 2 screws
- Speed: 35 knots (65 km/h; 40 mph)
- Complement: 122
- Armament: Original (1920): 4 × 4 in (100 mm), 1 × 3 in (76 mm) AA, 6 × .30 cal. (7.62 mm) machine guns, 12 × 21 in (533 mm) torpedo tubes (4x3, beam mounted); After refit (1943): 4 × 4 in (102 mm), 1 × 3 in (76 mm) AA, 2 × Oerlikon 20 mm AA guns, 2 × .30 cal. (7.62 mm) machine guns, 12 × 21 in (533 mm) torpedo tubes (4x3, beam mounted)

USS Borie (DD-215) was a Clemson-class destroyer in the United States Navy during World War II. She was the first ship named for Ulysses S. Grant's Secretary of the Navy, Adolph E. Borie. She served in the Black Sea, the Asiatic Fleet and the Caribbean between the wars, and in the Battle of the Atlantic, the long campaign to protect Allied shipping from German U-boats during World War II. As part of the antisubmarine Hunter-killer Group unit Task Group 21.14, the crew earned a Presidential Unit Citation for its "extraordinary performance." Borie also earned distinction in her final battle with U-405 in November 1943, exchanging small arms fire with and ramming the surfaced U-boat, although she was crippled during the engagement and thereafter scuttled by friendly ships.

== Construction ==
Borie was launched on 4 October 1919, by William Cramp & Sons; sponsored by Patty Borie, great-grandniece of Secretary Borie; and commissioned on 24 March 1920.

As a typical "flush decker," Borie was armed with four 4-inch (102 mm) guns, one 3-inch (76 mm) anti-aircraft (AA) gun, six .30 caliber (7.62 mm) machine guns, and twelve 21-inch (533 mm) torpedo tubes in four triple mounts, two mounts on each side. She was also fitted with depth charges and sonar for use against submarines. Her top speed was 35 knots (65 km/h).

Due to the heat in the tropics, it was customary for crewmen to sleep on the open decks of their ships, to be cooled by the breeze. The "flush deckers" often sported canvas awnings over their decks for this purpose.

== Service history ==
In April 1920, Borie joined the United States Naval Detachment in Turkish Waters for service in the Black Sea. The following year, she reported to Destroyer Division 38, Asiatic Fleet, and for the next four years alternating between the Philippine Islands during the winter and Chefoo and Shanghai, China, during the summer. She then returned home and patrolled in the Caribbean until the spring of 1927, when she made a cruise to Europe. Borie remained with the Atlantic Fleet until 1929 when she began a three-year tour with the Asiatic Fleet.

Following conversion to a Squadron Leader at San Diego (1932–33), Borie joined Destroyer Squadron 2, Battle Force. She remained in the Pacific on normal destroyer duty until late 1939, when she transited the Panama Canal to join the Neutrality Patrol. After the breakout of hostilities between the US and the Axis powers, she served first on the Inshore Patrol, 15th Naval District, in Panama Bay. In December 1941, in the face of the growing U-boat campaign in the Caribbean, she replaced USS Goff as flagship of Destroyer Division 67, which also included USS Tattnall and USS Barry. On 15 June 1942, she rescued survivors of USAT Merrimac, which had been torpedoed.

After returning to Philadelphia in November 1942, Borie went to New Orleans for an overhaul and then was reassigned to the Caribbean. During her refit, she had surface search radar installed; four of her .30 cal. (7.62 mm) machine guns were removed, and replaced with two single-mount Oerlikon 20 mm AA guns. For three months beginning in February 1943, Borie, Barry and Goff were attached to Escort Unit 23.2.4 with gunboats USS Courage and USS Tenacity and the patrol craft PC-575 and PC-592, which operated between Trinidad and Recife, Brazil with Admiral Jonas Ingram's South Atlantic Fleet (later Fourth Fleet). The escort unit accompanied convoys from Trinidad to Recife, where it was relieved by Brazilian Navy units who took the convoys to Bahia.

=== Patrols with Task Group 21.14 ===
Returning to Norfolk, Virginia in May, the three destroyers escorted convoy UGS-13 to Casablanca, French Morocco and on their return were assigned to hunter killer Task Group 21.14, escorting the escort carrier Card under her Captain Arnold J. Isbell. On 26 June 1943, under the command of Lt. Cdr. Charles H. Hutchins, at the time the youngest destroyer commander in the Navy, the destroyer departed the Caribbean and on 30 July put to sea in the North Atlantic as a member of the antisubmarine group built around Card. Borie completed three patrols with Card's group, providing valuable support for sister ships in the pursuit and sinking of German U-boats. The Presidential Unit Citation was awarded to Task Group 21.14 for actions during these three patrols:

For extraordinary performance during anti-submarine operations in mid-Atlantic from July 27 to October 25, 1943. At a time when continual flow of supplies along the United States–North Africa convoy route was essential to the maintenance of our established military supremacy and to the accumulation of reserves, the CARD, her embarked aircraft and her escorts pressed home a vigorous offensive which was largely responsible for the complete withdrawal of hostile U-boats from this vital supply area. Later, when submarines returned with deadlier weapons and augmented anti-aircraft defenses, this heroic Task Unit, by striking damaging blows at the onset of renewed campaigns, wrested the initiative from the enemy before the actual inception of projected large-scale attacks. Its distinctive fulfilment of difficult and hazardous missions contributed materially to victorious achievements by our land forces.

In late October 1943, TG 21.14 went out for a fourth patrol, searching for a reported refueling concentration of U-boats around a Milchkuhe (Milk Cow) tanker sub in the North Atlantic. The report was the result of the triangulation of bearings taken with high frequency radio direction finders (HFDF, nicknamed "huff-duff").

=== Final battle with U-405 ===
During her fourth patrol, Borie got a radar contact on U-256 shortly after 19:43 hours, 31 October and closed in. The U-boat promptly crash-dived. Two depth charge attacks forced her back to the surface, but she again submerged; after a third attack, a large oil slick was observed. Though U-256 made it home badly damaged, Hutchins believed the target to be sunk, and signalled Card: "Scratch one pig boat; am searching for more."

Borie then got another radar contact about 26 miles (42 km) from the first, at 01:53 hours on 1 November 1943, range 8,000 yards (7,300 m) and charged in to engage. At 2,800 yards (2,600 m) radar contact was lost, but sonar picked up the enemy sub at about the same time. Borie engaged U-405 (a Type VIIC U-boat) hours before dawn, at 49°00' N., 31°14' W. There were 15-foot (4.6 m) seas, with high winds and poor visibility. The destroyer initially launched depth charges, after which the submarine came (or was probably forced) to the surface. Borie then came about for another attack, engaging with 4-inch and 20 mm gunfire at a range of 400 yards (370 m).

The sub's six 20mm autocannons scored hits in the forward engine room and several scattered and harmless hits near the bridge, and her deck gun crew traversed their 88 mm (3.5 in) gun and took aim for their first shot at Borie's waterline; but Borie's 20 mm gunfire killed every exposed member of the sub's crew topside, and a salvo of three 4-inch shells then blew off the sub's deck gun before it fired a round. Borie then closed in and rammed U-405, but at the last moment, the submarine turned hard to port and a huge wave lifted the Borie's bow onto the foredeck of the U-boat.

After the ramming, Borie was high-centered on top of U-405, and until they separated, exchanges of small arms fire took place. This was a unique battle: unlike most other modern naval battles, it was decided by ramming and small arms fire at close range. Borie's 24-inch spotlight kept the submarine illuminated throughout the following battle, except for brief periods when it was turned off for tactical reasons.

The two ships were initially almost perpendicular to one another; as the battle progressed, wave action and the efforts of both crews to dislodge from the enemy ship resulted in the two vessels becoming locked in a "V" for an extended fight, with the U-boat along Borie's port side. The two ships were locked together only 25–30° from parallel. The action of the seas began to open seams in Borie's hull forward and flood her forward engine room. The submarine's hull, made of thicker steel and sturdier beams to withstand deep diving, was better able to handle the stress. Hutchins reported later, "We were impressed by the ruggedness and toughness of these boats."

A sister ship of U-405: U-995 Type VIIC, with her 88 mm deck gun removed, at the German navy memorial at Laboe.

Normally, in a surface engagement, the superior armament, speed and reserve buoyancy of the destroyer would have been decisive. But in this unusual case, the destroyer was unable to depress her 4-inch and 3-inch deck guns enough to hit the sub, while all of the submarine's machine guns could be brought to bear. One or two 4-inch gun crews attempted to fire, but their shells passed harmlessly over the target. Borie's crew had a limited number of small arms, however, and the German deck mounts were completely open and had no protection. The executive officer had presented a virtually identical situation during drills on 27 October – a theoretical ramming by a U-boat on the port side – and as a result, after the ramming, Borie's crew took immediate action without orders.

In the extended and bitter fighting that ensued, several German sailors were killed in desperate attempts to man the submarine's deck weapons. As each man emerged from the hatch and ran toward the guns, he was illuminated by Borie's spotlight and met by a hail of gunfire. Borie's crew engaged the enemy with whatever was at hand: Tommy guns, rifles, pistols, shotguns intended for riot control, and even a Very pistol. Borie's executive officer and a signalman fired from the bridge throughout the fight. One German sailor was hit in the chest with a Very flare. One of the Oerlikon 20 mm cannon was also able to fire.

Borie's crewmen could clearly see a polar bear insignia painted on the conning tower and the three numerals of the submarine. The bow of the sub had been badly damaged by the depth charges and she was unable to submerge. U-405's deck armament was extensive: in addition to the 88 mm gun, she also had six Flak 38 autocannons, in one quadruple and four single mounts (note that a quad mount + 4 singles is 5 mounts and 8 guns not 6). These weapons would have been devastating to Borie's exposed crew if they had been continuously manned. Occasionally, a German crewman would reach one of the Flak mounts, and open fire briefly before he was killed. Other German sailors kept up a sporadic small arms fire of their own from open hatchways.

=== Sinking of U-405 ===
Finally, U-405 and Borie separated and the crews attempted to engage each other with torpedoes, to no effect. At this point, about 35 of the German crew of 49 had been killed or lost overboard. Borie had been badly damaged and was moving at a reduced speed, while the sub was still capable of maneuvering at a similar speed. U-405's tighter turning radius effectively prevented Borie from bringing her superior broadside firepower to bear, and her skipper, Korvettenkapitän Rolf-Heinrich Hopmann, did a masterful job of maneuvering his badly damaged boat with his remaining crew.

Borie shut off her searchlight, with her crew hoping U-405 would attempt to escape and provide a better target for gunfire. The submarine did attempt to speed away, and Borie switched her searchlight back on and turned to bring her broadside guns and a depth charge thrower to bear. The sub was bracketed by shallow-set depth charges and struck by a 4-inch shell and came to a stop. Borie's crew observed about 14 sailors signalling their surrender and abandoning ship in yellow rubber rafts, and Hutchins gave the order to cease fire; several of them were apparently wounded, being loaded into the rafts in stretchers by their shipmates. The last man to leave the stricken ship was wearing an officer's cap. U-405 sank slowly by the stern at 02:57. She was seen to explode underwater, probably from scuttling charges set by the last officer to leave. Hutchins reported later,

When the submarine sank, there was a yell that went up from all hands – it probably could be heard in Berlin. The men were clasping each other and patting each other on the back, and all during the action, there were times when it was actually comical to observe the situation, particularly with the submarine pinned underneath ... heretofore their one dream had been to catch a submarine, depth charge him, bring him to the surface and then to sink him with gunfire, this particular action more than justified their hopes.

The survivors were observed firing star shells: Borie's crew believed this to be a distress signal, and maneuvered in an attempt to recover them from their rubber rafts, as they approached 50–60 yards (46–55 m) off the port bow. But as it turned out, the Germans were signalling another surfaced U-boat, which answered with a star shell of her own. A Borie lookout reported a torpedo passing close by from that U-boat, and Borie had no choice but to protect herself by sailing away. Borie was forced to sail through the U-405 survivors' rafts as she turned away from the other U-boat, but the men on the rafts were observed firing another Very flare as Borie steamed away in a radical zigzag pattern. No German survivors were ever recovered by either side; all 49 crewmen were lost.

A jubilant radio report of the sinking of U-405 was sent to Card after the engagement, before the extent of the ship's damage was fully realized. Then her radio fell silent. Borie attempted to reach her scheduled rendezvous with the rest of the Card Task Group, planned for shortly after sunrise.

=== Scuttling of Borie ===
Because of the loss of electric power, the crew had to wait until daylight to fully assess the damage to their ship. First light brought a thick fog. Borie was too badly damaged by the collision to reach the rendezvous in time, or even be towed to port by her sister ships. She had sustained severe underwater damage along her entire port side, including both engine rooms, as the two ships were pounded together by the sea before separating. The stress of the wave action from the 15-foot waves, as Borie was pinned against the U-boat's hull, had caused damage to key operating systems throughout the ship.

The forward engine room and generators were completely flooded, and only the starboard engine was operating in the partially flooded aft engine room. Auxiliary power had been lost and speed was reduced. The most critical damage was the compromised hull; but steam and water lines had separated, and most of the freshwater for the boilers had been lost, compounding the drive system problems. As a result, Hutchins was forced to use saltwater in the boilers: the reduction in steam pressure forcing him to further reduce speed to 10 knots, making her an easy target for U-boats.

At about 11:00, the communications officer restarted the Kohler emergency radio generator with a mixture of Zippo lighter fluid and alcohol from a torpedo; a distress call was sent, a homing beacon was set up and, after some delays due to poor visibility, Borie was spotted by a Grumman TBF Avenger from Card. Valiant efforts were made to save the ship. Kerosene battle lanterns had to be used for all work below decks. The crew formed a bucket brigade, and all available topweight was jettisoned, even the gun director. All remaining torpedoes were fired. The lifeboat, torpedo tubes, 20 mm guns and machine guns were removed and thrown over the side, along with the small arms used against the U-boat crew, tons of tools and equipment, and over 100 mattresses. Only enough 4-inch ammunition was kept for a defensive action of 10 rounds per gun.

But the ship continued to slowly settle into the water with all pumps running; trailing fuel oil from all portside fuel tanks, and an approaching storm front had been reported. It would have been necessary to bring out a tugboat to tow her into port; due to the poor visibility prevalent in the North Atlantic, Hutchins believed the chances of a tugboat finding Borie were slim. The nearest port, Horta, was about 690 miles away; Iceland, Ireland and Newfoundland were all about 900 miles away, and the task group was at the approximate center of five reported U-boat wolfpacks. By now there were 20-foot (6.1 m) waves.

As nightfall approached at 16:30, Hutchins reluctantly ordered his exhausted crew to abandon ship. The Card task force had taken a substantial risk by leaving the escort carrier unprotected in sub-infested waters. Card was 10 miles away, but Goff and Barry were close by as the crew abandoned Borie; on orders from the Task Group commander, the ship was not scuttled at that time. Despite the sporadic machine gun and small arms fire from U-405, none of Borie's crewmen had been killed during the engagement, although several were wounded. But due to 44 °F (7 °C) water, 20-foot waves, high winds and severe exhaustion, three officers and 24 enlisted men were lost during the rescue operation. Hutchins reported, "Many of the lost were just unable to get over the side" of the two rescuing destroyers.

Still, the ship remained afloat through the night; Goff and Barry attempted to sink the wreck at first light, but torpedoes went astray in the heavy seas. One 4-inch shell from Barry struck the bridge and started a small fire, but she still refused to sink. The coup de grace was delivered on the morning of 2 November by a 500 lb (227 kg) bomb dropped by a TBF Avenger from VC-9 on Card. Borie finally sank at 0955 on 2 November. The survivors were transferred to the more spacious accommodations of Card for the journey home.

== Awards ==
Borie received three battle stars for her World War II service as well as the Presidential Unit Citation for her actions in the Card group. For the final battle, Borie crewmembers were awarded three Navy Cross medals, two Silver Star medals and one Legion of Merit medal.

== Bibliography ==
- Wright, C. C. (2003). "Question 40/02: Submarines Expended as Targets 1922". Warship International. XL (4): 286–298. ISSN 0043-0374.
