= USS Sea Rover =

United States Navy ship

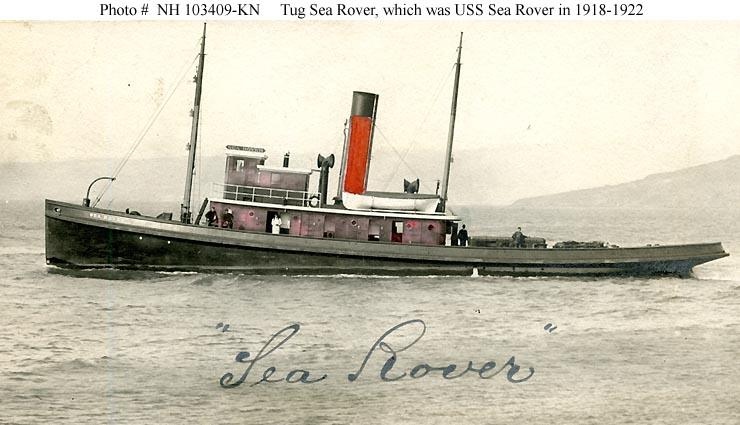
- A color-tinted photograph of SS Sea Rover in use as a commercial tugboat sometime between 1902 and 1917, probably in the San Francisco, California, area.

History

United States
- Name: USS Sea Rover
- Namesake: Previous name retained
- Builder: Fulton Iron Works, San Francisco, California
- Completed: 1902
- Acquired: 11 December 1917
- Commissioned: 31 January 1918
- Decommissioned: 4 March 1921
- Reclassified: From section patrol vessel (SP-1014) to fleet tug (AT-57) 1 July 1920
- Stricken: 25 February 1922
- Fate: Sold 25 February 1922
- Notes: Operated as commercial tugboat SS Sea Rover 1902-1917 and 1922-1949; scrapped 1949

General characteristics
- Type: Tug
- Tonnage: 199 Gross register tons
- Length: 121 ft (37 m)
- Beam: 24 ft 6 in (7.47 m)
- Draft: 14 ft (4.3 m)
- Propulsion: Steam engine
- Speed: 10 knots
- Complement: 20
- Armament: 1 × 1-3-inch (76.2-mm) gun; 2 × machine guns

USS Sea Rover (SP-1014), later AT-57, was a United States Navy armed tug in commission from 1918 to 1921.

== Construction, acquisition, and commissioning ==
Sea Rover was built in 1902 as the commercial tugboat SS Sea Rover by Fulton Iron Works at San Francisco, California. She operated in United States West Coast waters in mercantile service until 11 December 1917, when her owners, the Shipowners & Merchants Tugboat Company of San Francisco, sold her to the United States Shipping Board, which immediately transferred her to the U.S. Navy for use during World War I. She was assigned the section patrol number 1014 and commissioned on 31 January 1918 as USS Sea Rover (SP-1014).

== U.S. Navy service ==
=== World War I ===
Sea Rover departed Mare Island Navy Yard at Vallejo, California, on 11 February 1918 towing three barges to the United States East Coast. After completing this voyage, she underwent repairs at Norfolk, Virginia, then served briefly as station tug at New London, Connecticut, before arriving at Bermuda on 18 May 1918 to serve as station tug there.

As her machinery was considered too unreliable for convoy work, Sea Rover remained at Bermuda for over a year, primarily engaged in towing in the harbor and near the islands. However, on 2 September 1918, she departed Bermuda to escort the destroyer USS Barry (Destroyer No. 2) to Charleston, South Carolina. Barry released the tug from escort duty on 3 September 1918 and directed her to return to Bermuda, but on 4 September 1918 Sea Rover ran into a hurricane. During the next two days, Sea Rover cracked a seam in a fuel tank, developed a severe list which caused her to send an SOS, and finally took refuge in the Bahama Islands on 7 September 1918. Bermuda did not hear of her arrival at the Bahamas and, after an unsuccessful search for her, mistakenly reported her lost at sea on 9 September 1918.

Sea Rover underwent repairs at Jacksonville, Florida, and returned to Bermuda on 14 October 1918, where she remained as station tug through the end of the war on 11 November 1918 and into 1919.

=== Postwar ===
Sea Rover next left Bermuda on 10 May 1919 to escort 40 submarine chasers to Charleston, South Carolina, but suffered a boiler failure during the voyage and had to be towed there herself. After repairs, she returned to duty at Bermuda on 10 June 1919, but was detached from duty there on 1 July 1919.

Departing Bermuda on 14 July 1919, Sea Rover towed a gunnery target to the United States West Coast and arrived at San Francisco on 27 September 1919. There she was drydocked and then laid up in reserve with a caretaker crew. While in reserve, Sea Rover was reclassified as a fleet tug (AT) and redesignated AT-57 on 1 July 1920.

== Disposal and later career ==
Sea Rover was decommissioned on 4 March 1921 and stricken from the Navy List effective on the date of her final sale. This proved to be 25 February 1922, when she was sold to R. W. Greene of San Francisco.

Once again SS Sea Rover, the tug returned to commercial service with the Shipowners and Merchants Tugboat Company of San Francisco until scrapped in 1949.
