= German submarine U-426 =

German type VII C world war II submarine

History

Nazi Germany
- Name: U-426
- Ordered: 5 June 1941
- Builder: Danziger Werft, Danzig
- Yard number: 127
- Laid down: 20 June 1942
- Launched: 6 February 1943
- Commissioned: 12 May 1943
- Fate: Sunk on 8 January 1944

General characteristics
- Class & type: Type VIIC submarine
- Displacement: 769 tonnes (757 long tons) surfaced; 871 t (857 long tons) submerged
- Length: 67.10 m (220 ft 2 in) o/a; 50.50 m (165 ft 8 in) pressure hull
- Beam: 6.20 m (20 ft 4 in) o/a; 4.70 m (15 ft 5 in) pressure hull
- Height: 9.60 m (31 ft 6 in)
- Draught: 4.74 m (15 ft 7 in)
- Installed power: 2,800–3,200 PS (2,100–2,400 kW; 2,800–3,200 bhp) (diesels); 750 PS (550 kW; 740 shp) (electric)
- Propulsion: 2 shafts; 2 × diesel engines; 2 × electric motors.
- Speed: 17.7 knots (32.8 km/h; 20.4 mph) surfaced; 7.6 knots (14.1 km/h; 8.7 mph) submerged
- Range: 8,500 nmi (15,700 km; 9,800 mi) at 10 knots (19 km/h; 12 mph) surfaced; 80 nmi (150 km; 92 mi) at 4 knots (7.4 km/h; 4.6 mph) submerged
- Test depth: 230 m (750 ft); Crush depth: 250–295 m (820–968 ft)
- Complement: 4 officers, 40–56 enlisted
- Armament: 5 × 53.3 cm (21 in) torpedo tubes (four bow, one stern); 14 × torpedoes; 1 × 8.8 cm (3.46 in) deck gun (220 rounds); 2 × twin 2 cm (0.79 in) C/30 anti-aircraft guns

Service record
- Part of: 8th U-boat Flotilla; 12 May – 30 September 1943; 11th U-boat Flotilla; 1 – 31 October 1943; 1st U-boat Flotilla; 1 November 1943 – 8 January 1944
- Identification codes: M 46 323
- Commanders: Kptlt. Christian Reich; 12 May 1943 – 8 January 1944
- Operations: 2 patrols: 1st patrol: 5 October – 29 November 1943; 2nd patrol: 3 – 8 January 1944
- Victories: 1 merchant ship sunk (6,625 GRT)

German submarine U-426 was a Type VIIC U-boat of Nazi Germany's Kriegsmarine during World War II. She carried out two patrols. She was a member of seven wolfpacks. She sank one ship. She was sunk by an Australian Sunderland flying boat on 8 January 1944.

== Design ==
German Type VIIC submarines were preceded by the shorter Type VIIB submarines. U-426 had a displacement of 769 tonnes (757 long tons) when at the surface and 871 tonnes (857 long tons) while submerged. She had a total length of 67.10 m (220 ft 2 in), a pressure hull length of 50.50 m (165 ft 8 in), a beam of 6.20 m (20 ft 4 in), a height of 9.60 m (31 ft 6 in), and a draught of 4.74 m (15 ft 7 in). The submarine was powered by two Germaniawerft F46 four-stroke, six-cylinder supercharged diesel engines producing a total of 2,800 to 3,200 metric horsepower (2,060 to 2,350 kW; 2,760 to 3,160 shp) for use while surfaced, two Siemens-Schuckert GU 343/38–8 double-acting electric motors producing a total of 750 metric horsepower (550 kW; 740 shp) for use while submerged. She had two shafts and two 1.23 m (4 ft) propellers. The boat was capable of operating at depths of up to 230 metres (750 ft).

The submarine had a maximum surface speed of 17.7 knots (32.8 km/h; 20.4 mph) and a maximum submerged speed of 7.6 knots (14.1 km/h; 8.7 mph). When submerged, the boat could operate for 80 nautical miles (150 km; 92 mi) at 4 knots (7.4 km/h; 4.6 mph); when surfaced, she could travel 8,500 nautical miles (15,700 km; 9,800 mi) at 10 knots (19 km/h; 12 mph). U-426 was fitted with five 53.3 cm (21 in) torpedo tubes (four fitted at the bow and one at the stern), fourteen torpedoes, one 8.8 cm (3.46 in) SK C/35 naval gun, 220 rounds, and two twin 2 cm (0.79 in) C/30 anti-aircraft guns. The boat had a complement of between forty-four and sixty.

== Service history ==
The submarine was laid down on 20 June 1942 at the Danziger Werft (yard) at Danzig (now Gdansk), as yard number 127, launched on 6 February 1943 and commissioned on 12 May under the command of Kapitänleutnant Christian Reich.

She served with the 8th U-boat Flotilla from 12 May 1943 and the 11th flotilla from 1 October of that year.

=== Patrols and loss ===
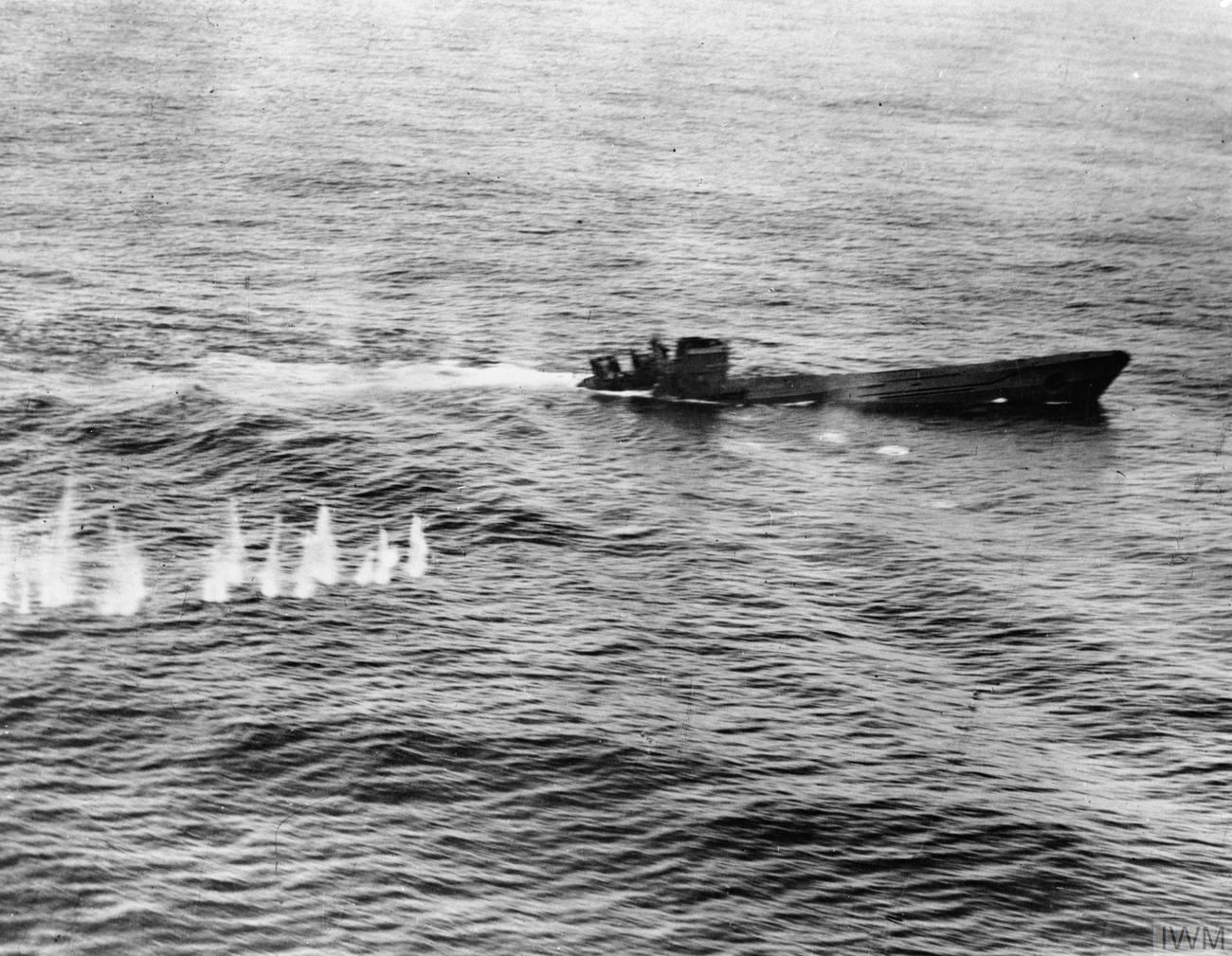
U-426 down by the stern and sinking after attacks by a Short Sunderland flying boat.

The boat's first patrol was preceded by a trip from Kiel in Germany to Bergen in Norway. U-426 then left Bergen on 5 October 1943 and headed for the Atlantic Ocean via the gap between Iceland and the Faroe Islands. She sank the British ship Essex Lance on 15 October 408 nautical miles (756 km; 470 mi) east of Cape Farewell (Greenland). The submarine arrived in Brest in occupied France on 29 November.

Her second sortie began on 3 January 1944. On 8 January, she was attacked and sunk by depth charges dropped by an Australian Sunderland flying boat of No. 10 Squadron RAAF.

Fifty-one men went down with the U-boat; there were no survivors.

=== Wolfpacks ===
U-426 took part in seven wolfpacks, namely:

- Schlieffen (16 – 22 October 1943)
- Siegfried (22 – 27 October 1943)
- Siegfried 2 (27 – 30 October 1943)
- Jahn (30 October – 2 November 1943)
- Tirpitz 4 (2 – 8 November 1943)
- Eisenhart 9 (9 – 10 November 1943)
- Schill 1 (16 – 21 November 1943)

== Summary of raiding history ==
Date	Ship Name	Nationality	Tonnage (GRT)	Fate
15 October 1943	Essex Lance	United Kingdom	6,625	Sunk

== Bibliography ==
- Busch, Rainer; Röll, Hans-Joachim (1999). German U-boat commanders of World War II : a biographical dictionary. Translated by Brooks, Geoffrey. London, Annapolis, Md: Greenhill Books, Naval Institute Press. ISBN 1-55750-186-6.
- Busch, Rainer; Röll, Hans-Joachim (1999). Deutsche U-Boot-Verluste von September 1939 bis Mai 1945 [German U-boat losses from September 1939 to May 1945]. Der U-Boot-Krieg (in German). Vol. IV. Hamburg, Berlin, Bonn: Mittler. ISBN 3-8132-0514-2.
- Gröner, Erich; Jung, Dieter; Maass, Martin (1991). U-boats and Mine Warfare Vessels. German Warships 1815–1945. Vol. 2. Translated by Thomas, Keith; Magowan, Rachel. London: Conway Maritime Press. ISBN 0-85177-593-4.
- Kemp, Paul (1999). U-Boats Destroyed – German Submarine Losses in the World Wars. London: Arms & Armour. ISBN 1-85409-515-3.
