= USS Barry (DD-248) =

Clemson-class destroyer

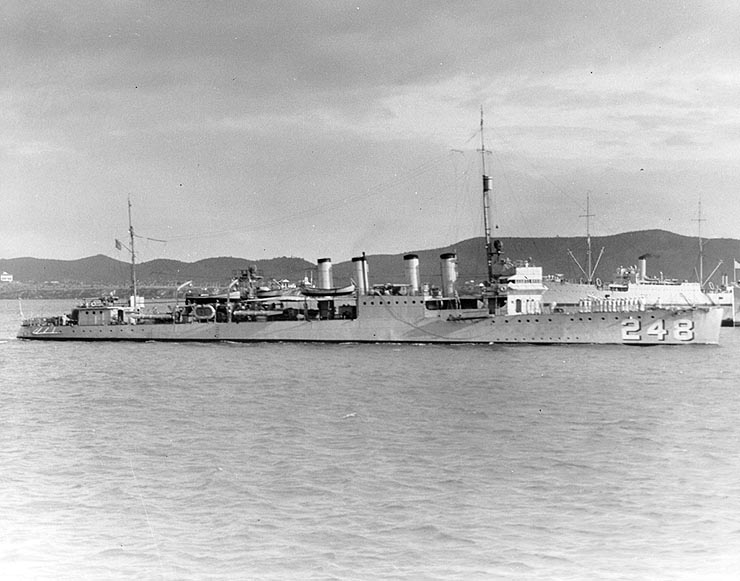
- USS Barry (DD-248)

History

United States
- Name: Barry
- Namesake: John Barry
- Builder: New York Shipbuilding
- Laid down: 26 July 1919
- Launched: 28 Oct 1920
- Commissioned: reserve: 28 December 1920; fully: 15 November 1921
- Decommissioned: 21 June 1945
- Reclassified: APD-29, 15 January 1944
- Stricken: 21 June 1945
- Fate: Sunk by kamikazes, 21 June 1945

General characteristics
- Class & type: Clemson-class destroyer
- Displacement: 1,215 tons
- Length: 314 feet 4 inches (95.81 m)
- Beam: 31 feet 8 inches (9.65 m)
- Draft: 9 feet 10 inches (3.00 m)
- Propulsion: 26,500 shp (20 MW); geared turbines, 2 screws
- Speed: 33.3 knots (61.7 km/h)
- Range: 4,900 nm (9,100 km); @ 15 kn
- Boats & landing craft carried: 4 LCP landing craft
- Complement: 130 officers and enlisted
- Armament: 3 x 3 in (76 mm) guns, 2 x 40 mm guns, 5 x 20 mm guns, 1 depth charge rack, 4 depth charge projectors

Barry (DD-248/APD-29) was a Clemson-class destroyer in the United States Navy during World War II. She was the second ship named for Commodore John Barry.

Barry was launched 28 October 1920 by New York Shipbuilding Co., Camden, New Jersey; sponsored by Mrs. Shelton E. Martin, great-grandniece of Commodore Barry, and commissioned with 50 percent complement 28 December 1920.

== Service history ==
Barry was held in reserve commission until 15 November 1921, when she was placed in full commission and reported to the Atlantic Fleet. In October 1922, she departed Hampton Roads, Virginia, for the Mediterranean where she served with the U. S. Naval Detachment in Turkish Waters until July 1923. Returning to the East Coast 10 August 1923, she joined Destroyer Squadron 14, Scouting Fleet. Later in August and September, Barry operated as a plane guard in the Atlantic for the U.S. Army's "Around the World Flight" and was stationed between Labrador and Nova Scotia, Canada. When one of the three Army planes ditched owing to engine trouble, Barry transported the pilots to Pictou, Nova Scotia, where they boarded a replacement plane to continue their flight home to Seattle via Boston and across the United States.

Early in 1925, Barry transited the Panama Canal and joined the Battle Fleet for maneuvers in the Pacific. She returned to the East Coast in July 1925, and took up routine duties with the Scouting Fleet until February 1932, when she returned to the Pacific for fleet maneuvers. Upon completion of maneuvers, she returned to the Atlantic and was assigned to Rotating Reserve Destroyer Squadron 19 at Norfolk, 20 December 1932.

Barry was recommissioned at Norfolk 20 June 1933 and on 1 July sailed for San Diego to Join Destroyer Division 7, Scouting Force. She served with the Scouting Force until May 1936 when she returned to the Atlantic and for a short time served as flagship of Destroyer Division 8. Later in 1936 she again returned to the Pacific, joining Destroyer Division 22, Battle Force. Between January and April 1938 she was in Hawaiian waters and on 21 May 1938 was transferred to Destroyer Division 21, in the Atlantic.

=== World War II ===
Barry joined Destroyer Division 67 in the Canal Zone 18 October 1940. Still on duty there when the United States entered World War II, she was assigned escort and anti-submarine warfare missions against the German submarines in the Atlantic. Early in 1942, Barry operated in the Caribbean escorting convoys between Guantánamo Bay, Cuba, and Panama; and Curaçao and Trinidad. Later in the year and throughout the first half of 1943 she performed escort duties in the South Atlantic, operating from Trinidad.

Between July and November 1943, she served as a unit of TG 21.14, an offensive antisubmarine patrol which operated along the North Atlantic convoy lanes. The group conducted two sweeps (30 July – 10 September and 28 September – 8 November) during which aircraft from Card sank eight German submarines. Barry and Goff rescued survivors of Borie after she was fatally damaged 1 November while sinking U-405 by ramming.

Barry underwent conversion to a high-speed transport at Charleston Navy Yard, 31 December 1943 – 17 February 1944 (reclassified APD-29, 15 January 1944). Barry departed the East Coast 13 April 1944 for Mers-el-Kebir, Algeria, arriving 30 April. Practice amphibious landings were carried out until 14 August, when she sortied for the invasion of southern France.

Between 15 and 20 August 1944, she landed her troops on the Islands of Levant and Port Cros, as well as on the mainland of France. Between August and December, Barry served on escort duty in the western Mediterranean and then returned to the United States, arriving at Norfolk 23 December 1944. After brief repairs, Barry departed for the Pacific and arrived at Pearl Harbor 24 March 1945. After training in the Hawaiian Islands, she arrived off Okinawa 16 May and performed patrol and escort duties during the occupation of the island.

== Fate ==
On 25 May, she was attacked by two kamikazes while on patrol 35 miles northwest of Okinawa. One was shot down, but the other broke through the barrage and struck Barry below her bridge. Twenty-eight of her crew were wounded by shrapnel. The explosion of the plane's gasoline tanks and bomb ignited fuel oil escaping from Barry's ruptured tanks. The fire threatened the forward magazine which could not be reached to flood. At 1340, 40 minutes after the plane struck, the commanding officer gave the order to abandon ship. Barry's boats were lowered and all hands safely cleared the side.

At 1500, the water had risen until the forward magazine was covered, minimizing the danger of explosion. A skeleton crew, together with parties from Sims and Roper then reboarded Barry and the last fires were extinguished at 0630 the next day.

Barry was towed to the anchorage at Kerama Retto 28 May, and was found too extensively damaged to warrant repair or salvage. Stripped of useful gear, she was decommissioned 21 June 1945. Later in the day, she was towed from the harbor of Kerama Retto to be used as a decoy for the kamikazes. At 1845, while under tow, two Nakajima Ki-43 kamikazes attacked, coming in low over the surrounding land. One plane hit Barry and the other hit her escort, LSM-59, sinking both ships. LSM-59 sank in thirteen minutes with two dead and eight wounded, while Barry settled to six inches of freeboard and sank the next morning despite salvage efforts.

== Awards ==
- Presidential Unit Citation (as a unit of TG 21.14)
- American Defense Service Medal with "FLEET" clasp
- American Campaign Medal with one battle star
- European-African-Middle Eastern Campaign Medal with two battle stars
- Asiatic-Pacific Campaign Medal with one battle star
- World War II Victory Medal

Barry was possibly the only U.S. Navy ship to receive battle stars for all three area campaign medals.
