= John Barry (naval officer) =

Irish-born American naval officer (1745–1803)

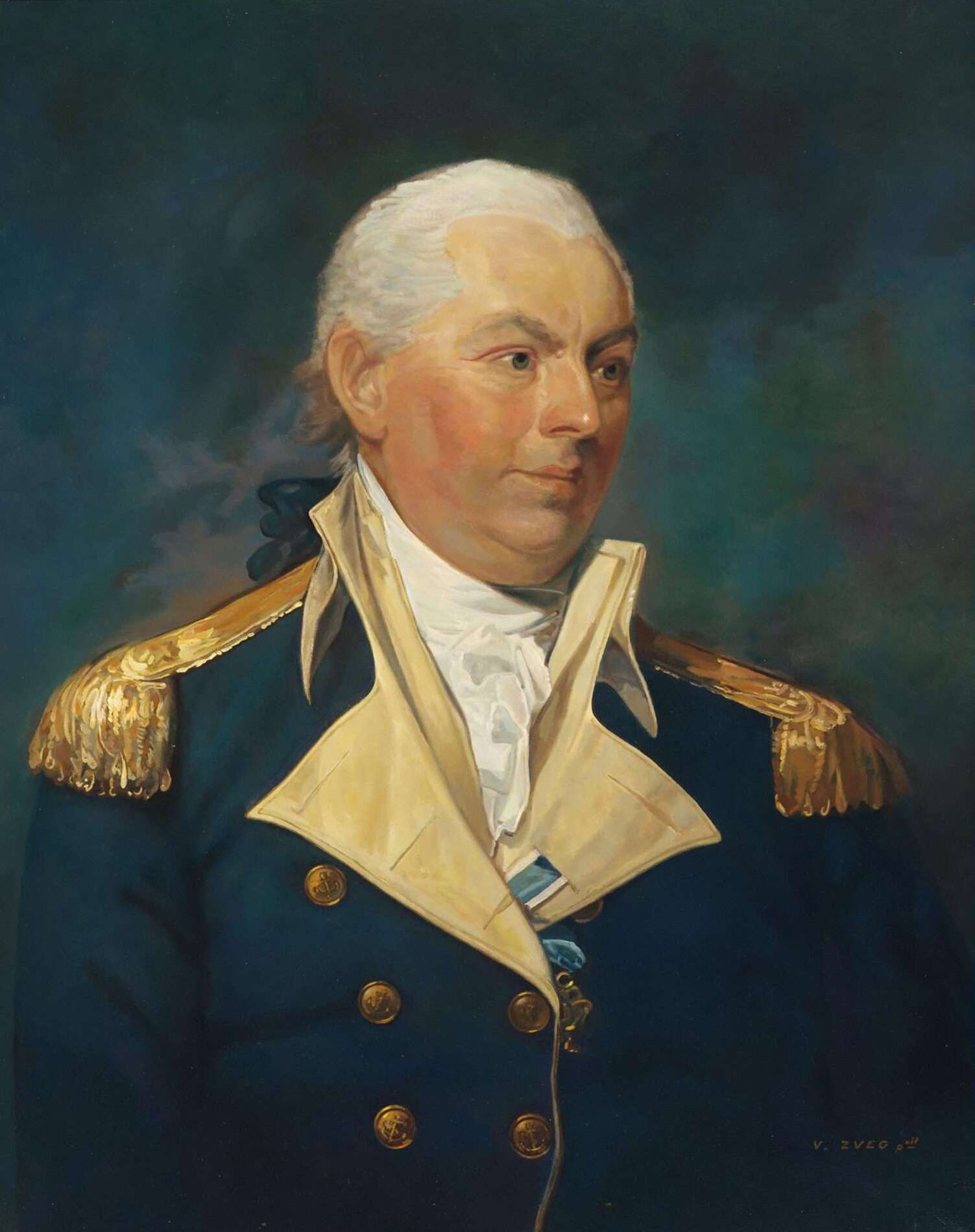
- 1972 portrait of Barry by V. Zveg after an 1801 portrait by Gilbert Stuart
- Born: March 25, 1745; Tacumshane, County Wexford, Kingdom of Ireland
- Died: September 13, 1803 (aged 58); Philadelphia, Pennsylvania, U.S.
- Burial place: St. Mary's Roman Catholic Church; Philadelphia, Pennsylvania, U.S.
- Military career
- Allegiance: United States
- Branch: Continental Navy; United States Navy
- Service years: 1775–1783, 1797–1803
- Rank: Commodore
- Conflicts: American Revolutionary War; Lexington vs. HMS Edward; Battle of Turtle Gut Inlet; Alliance vs. HMS Atalanta and Trepassey; Alliance vs. Sybil; Quasi-War

John Barry (March 25, 1745 – September 13, 1803) was an Irish-born American naval officer who served in the Continental Navy during the American Revolutionary War and in the United States Navy during the Quasi-War. He has been credited by some as "The Father of the American Navy", sharing that moniker with John Paul Jones and John Adams, and was appointed as a captain in the Continental Navy on December 7, 1775. Barry was the first captain placed in command of an American warship commissioned for service under the Continental flag. After the Revolutionary War, he became the first commissioned American naval officer, at the rank of commodore, receiving his commission from President George Washington in 1797.

== Early life and education ==
Barry was born on March 25, 1745, in Ballysampson, Tacumshane, County Wexford to a Catholic family. When Barry's family was evicted from their home by their landlord, they moved to Rosslare on the coast, where his uncle worked a fishing skiff. As a young man, Barry determined upon a life as a seaman, and he started out as a cabin boy on commercial vessels. He later served in the Royal Navy, gaining invaluable command experience

Barry eventually left his native country and immigrated to the American colonies, where merchant fleets were in need of experienced sailors. When the American Revolution began, Barry found himself sympathetic to the Patriot cause and decided to volunteer his services.

== Career ==
Barry was formally commissioned as a captain in the Continental Navy on March 14, 1776; his warrant was signed by John Hancock, president of the Second Continental Congress. Barry, a Catholic, was a religious man and began each day at sea with a reading from the Bible. He had great regard for his crew and their well-being, making sure they were properly provisioned while at sea.

During his naval career, Barry commanded the U.S. warships Delaware, Lexington, Raleigh, Alliance and United States.

=== Command of Lexington ===
Captain Barry's first American command was USS Lexington, of 14 guns, which began on December 7, 1775. He was the first officer, army or navy, to receive a commission from the Continental Congress. Lexington sailed on March 31, 1776. On April 7, 1776, off the Capes of Virginia, Barry fell in with Edward, a ship's tender servicing the British frigate HMS Liverpool, and after a desperate fight of one hour and twenty minutes captured and brought Edward into Philadelphia.

On June 28, the Pennsylvania brig Nancy, carrying 386 barrels of powder in her hold, ran aground while attempting to elude the British ship-sloop Kingfisher. Barry ordered the precious powder rowed ashore during the night, leaving only 100 barrels. A delayed action fuse was left inside the brig, exploding and killing seven members of a boarding party from Kingfisher which had just climbed aboard Nancy. This engagement became known as the Battle of Turtle Gut Inlet.

Barry retained command of Lexington until October 18, 1776. He was noted for his success in capturing several privateers operated by Loyalist crews to help enforce the British blockade.

=== Command of Delaware ===
In 1777, Barry was assigned to command USS Delaware, a brig which participated in ultimately unsuccessful American naval operations in the Delaware River.

=== Command of Raleigh ===
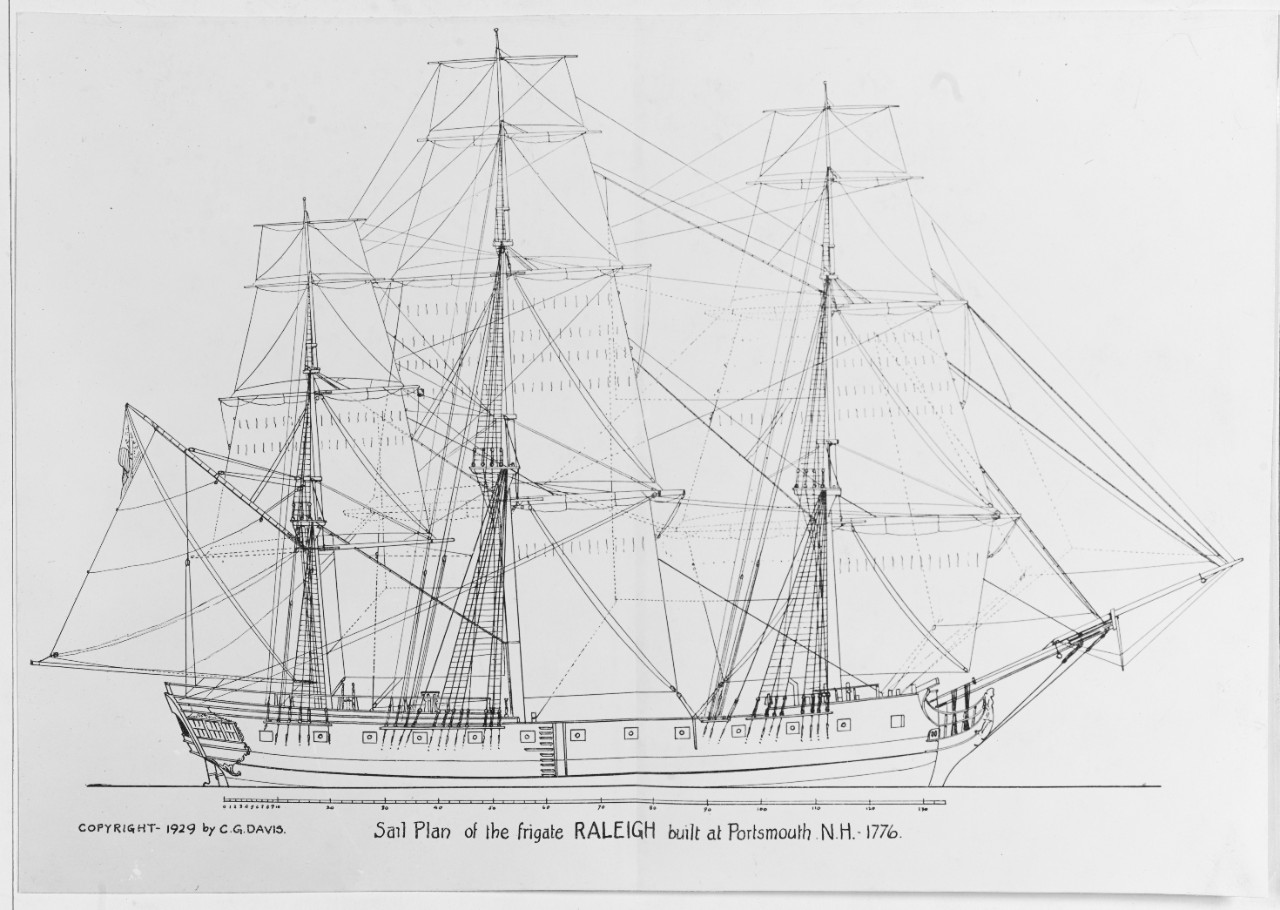
1929 sail plan of USS Raleigh

In 1778, Barry assumed his third command, USS Raleigh, capturing three prizes before being run aground while fighting an action on September 27, 1778. He and his crew escaped and scuttled the ship, but she was raised by the British, who refloated and converted her into a Royal Navy vessel. Eager to improve the fighting capabilities of the Continental Navy, Barry authored the first American navy signal book, published in 1780, to improve communications at sea among American vessels traveling in formation.

=== Command of Alliance ===
Barry was seriously wounded on May 29, 1781, while taking part in the capture of HMS Atalanta and her sister ship Trepassey.

He and his crew of the USS Alliance fought and won the final naval battle of the American Revolution 140 miles (230 km) south of Cape Canaveral on March 10, 1783.

Barry was successful in suppressing three mutinies during his career as an officer in the Continental Navy.

=== Commodore commission ===
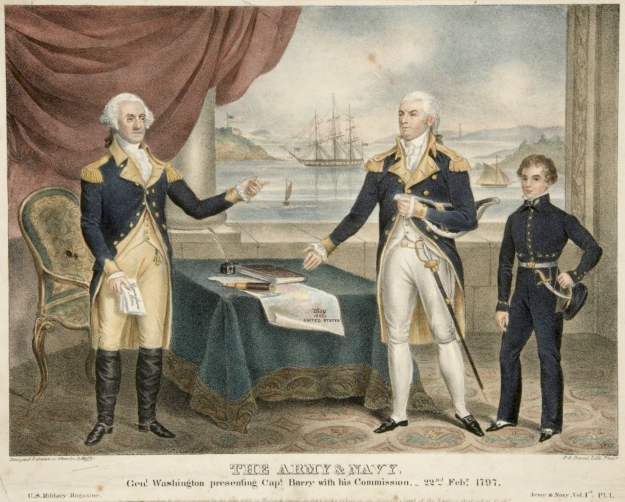
Barry receiving commodore commission from Washington

On February 22, 1797, he was issued Commission Number 1 by President George Washington, backdated to June 4, 1794. His title was thereafter "commodore". He is recognized as not only the first American commissioned naval officer but also its first flag officer.

=== Command of United States ===
Appointed senior captain upon the establishment of the U.S. Navy, he commanded the frigate United States in the Quasi-War with France. This ship transported commissioners William Richardson Davie and Oliver Ellsworth to France to negotiate a new Franco-American alliance.

Barry's last day of active duty was March 6, 1801, when he brought USS United States into port, but he remained head of the Navy until his death on September 13, 1803, from asthma. Barry died childless.

== Later life and death ==
Coat of Arms of John Barry

Barry died at Strawberry Hill in present-day Philadelphia on September 13, 1803, and was buried in the graveyard of St. Mary's Roman Catholic Church.

The executors of his estate were his wife Sarah, his nephew Patrick Hayes and his friend John Leamy.

== Personal life ==
On October 24, 1768, Barry married Mary Cleary, who died in 1774. On July 7, 1777, he married Sarah Austin, daughter of Samuel Austin and Sarah Keen of New Jersey. Barry had no children, but he helped raise Patrick and Michael Hayes, children of his sister, Eleanor, and her husband, Thomas Hayes, who both died in the 1780s.

== Commemorations ==
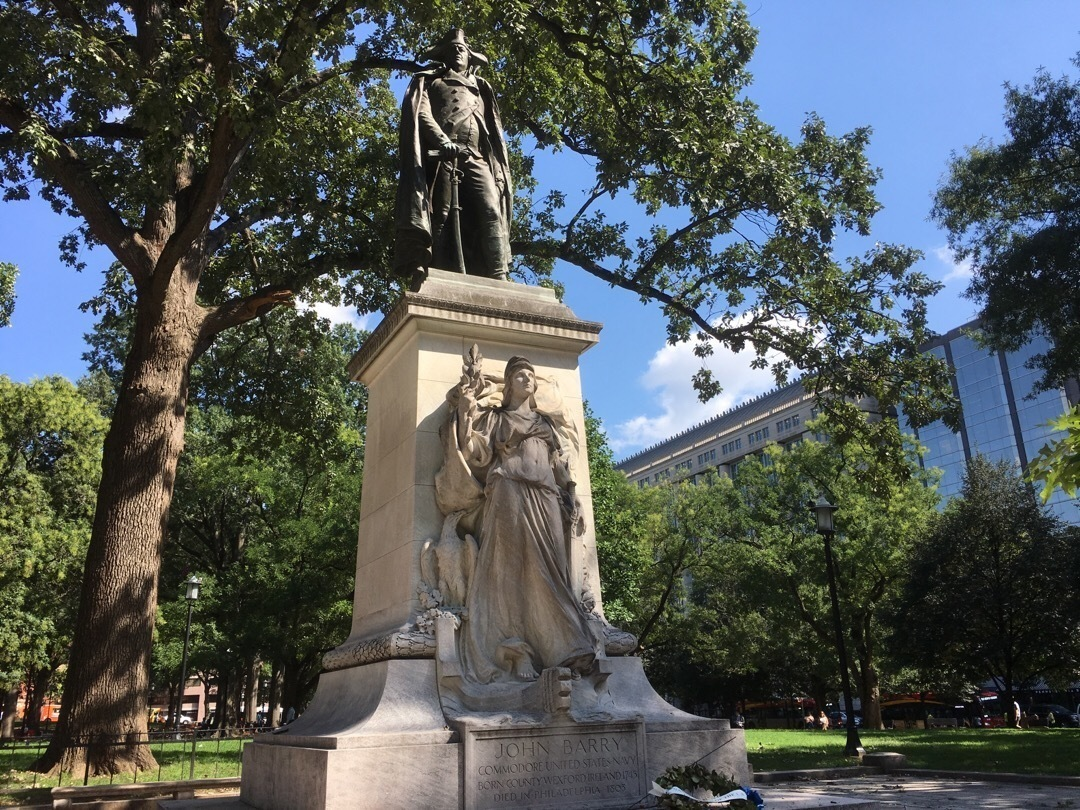
The Commodore John Barry statue by John Boyle has been exhibited in Washington, D.C.'s Franklin Square since 1914

- The U.S. Revenue Cutter Commodore Barry, captured off Maine during the War of 1812.
- Commodore Barry Park in Brooklyn, New York. It is the oldest park in the borough. It was renamed for Commodore Barry in 1951, due to its location next to the Brooklyn Navy Yard, which Barry helped found.
- A large statue of Barry stands directly in front of the formal entrance to Independence Hall in Philadelphia, Pennsylvania.
- Four U.S. Navy ships
  - USS Barry (DD-2) (1902–1920)
  - USS Barry (DD-248) (1921–1945)
  - USS Barry (DD-933) (1956–1983)
  - USS Barry (DDG-52) (1992–present)
- In World War II, the United States Liberty ship SS John Barry was named in his honor.
- There is a large portrait of Commodore Barry at the Rhode Island State House in Providence; and Title 16 of the Rhode Island Statutes (§ 16-20-3 – Days of special observance) requires observing September 13 as Commodore John Barry Day.
- A statue of Barry overlooks the Crescent Quay in Wexford town in Ireland. It was a gift to the town from the United States and was delivered by a United States Navy destroyer, USS John R. Pierce (DD-753). The statue was unveiled in 1956, and each year a parade and wreath-laying ceremony takes place at the statue to celebrate "Barry Day", commemorated by the Irish Naval Service and the Minister for Defence.
- A statue of Barry by Eugene Kormendi is placed in the west court of Dillon Hall at the University of Notre Dame.
- Commodore Barry Bridge, which crosses the Delaware River from Chester, Pennsylvania to Bridgeport, New Jersey.
- John Barry Hall at Villanova University, hosting University ROTC programs
- Commodore Barry Club (Philadelphia Irish Center) Emlen Street and Carpenter Lane, Mount Airy, Philadelphia, Pennsylvania
- Barry Township, Schuylkill County, Pennsylvania
- Commodore John Barry Elementary School in Philadelphia, Pennsylvania
- Commodore John Barry Elementary School in Chicago, Illinois
- Commodore John Barry Division of Ancient Order of Hibernians, Annapolis, Maryland
- Commodore John Barry Division of Ancient Order of Hibernians, National Park, New Jersey
- Commodore John Barry Division of Ancient Order of Hibernians, Syracuse, New York
- John Barry Bar, Grand Hyatt Muscat, Muscat, Oman
- September 13, Commodore John Barry Day in New Jersey public schools
- Commodore John Barry Memorial Plaque at Staten Island Borough Hall
- A new plaque with a cannon was dedicated on March 10, 2007, in Port Canaveral.
- A plaque stands in the city of Boston on Boston Common.
- A plaque commemorating Barry and his crew of the Alliance for the final naval battle of the American Revolution is located at Jetty Park in Cape Canaveral, Florida.
- A stone plaque commemorating his grave site is located at Old St. Mary's Church in Philadelphia, PA.
- A six-foot bronze statue of Commodore John Barry stands in Franklin Square (between I and K streets on 14th St. N.W.) in Washington, D.C.
- Barry Hall is one of six military barracks facilities at the United States Merchant Marine Academy in commemoration of him.
- The visitor entrance to the United States Naval Academy, from Downtown Annapolis to the Visitor Center, commemorates Commodore John Barry. Inside the entrance is a monument to Commodore Barry with a plaque with an image of his commission, Number 1 in the United States Navy. Both the gate and the monument were erected by the Ancient Order of Hibernians
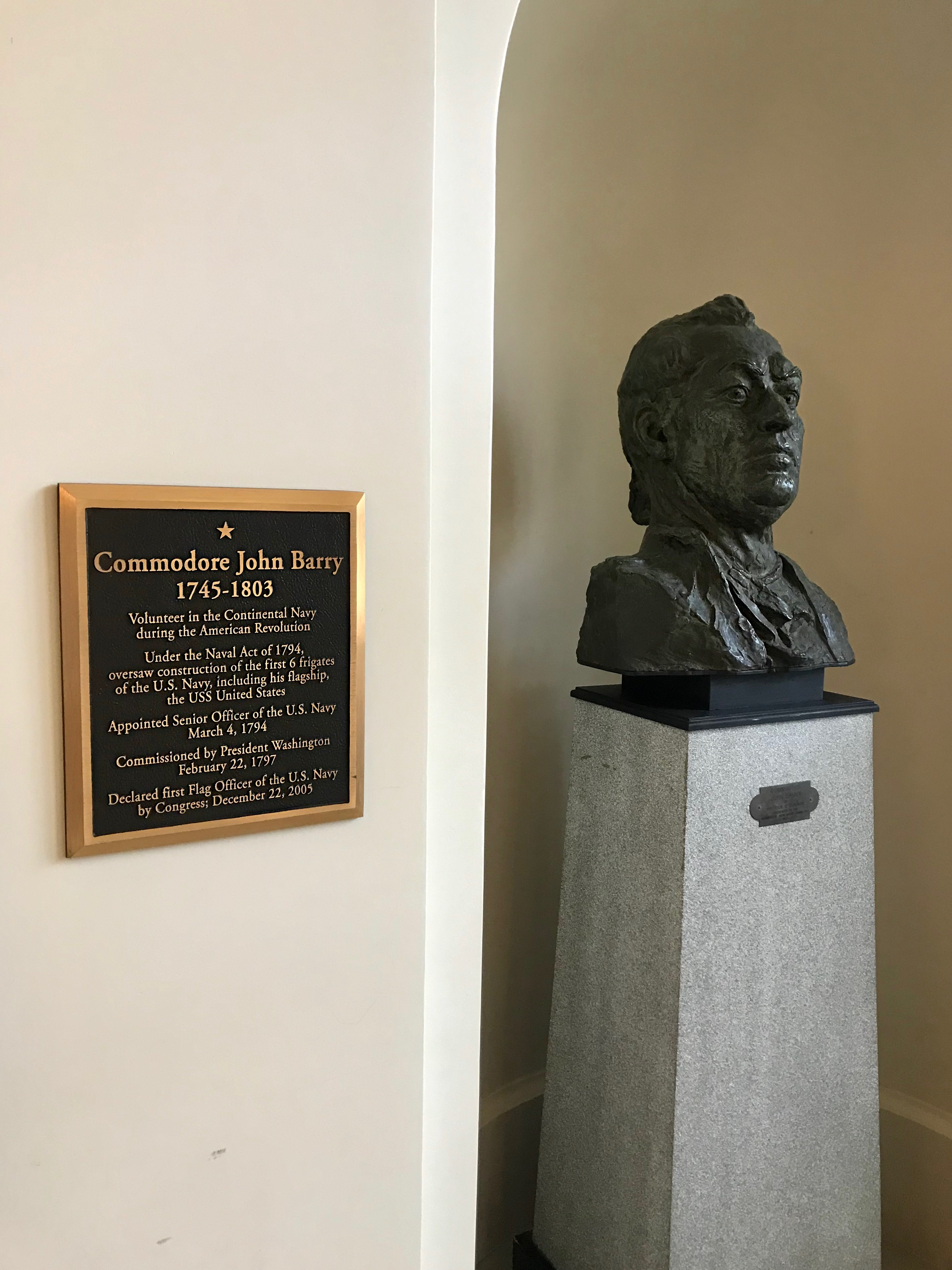
- Plaque and Bust of Commodore Barry at Rickover Hall, USNA
  There is a plaque and bust commemorating Commodore Barry on the main floor in the Rickover Hall classroom building at the United States Naval Academy.
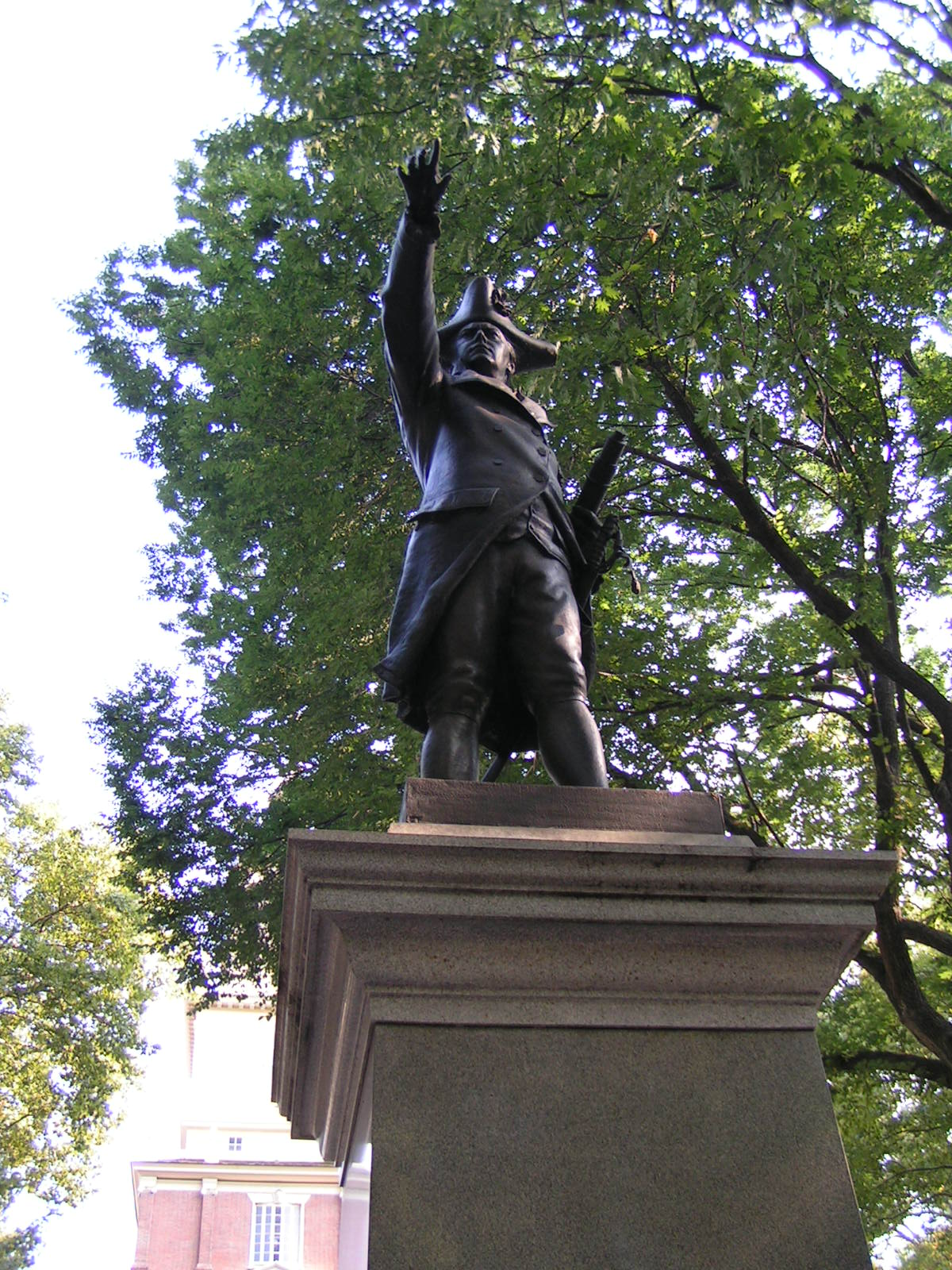
Statue at Independence Hall

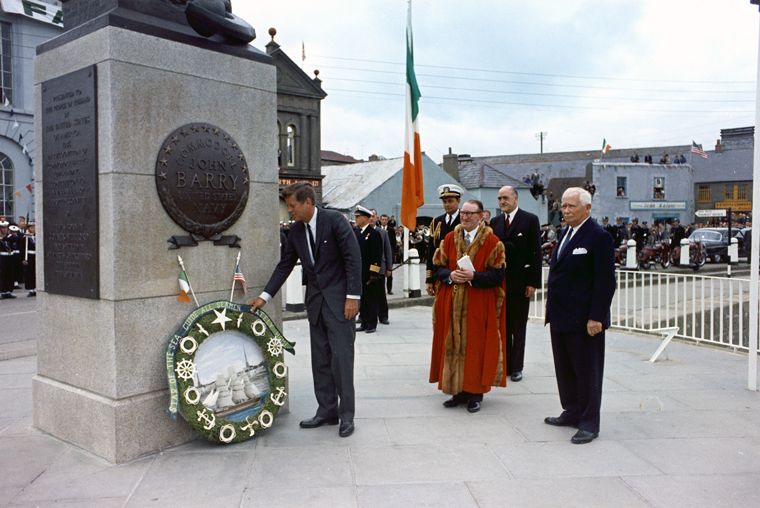
John F. Kennedy visiting the John Barry Memorial at Crescent Quay in Wexford, Ireland

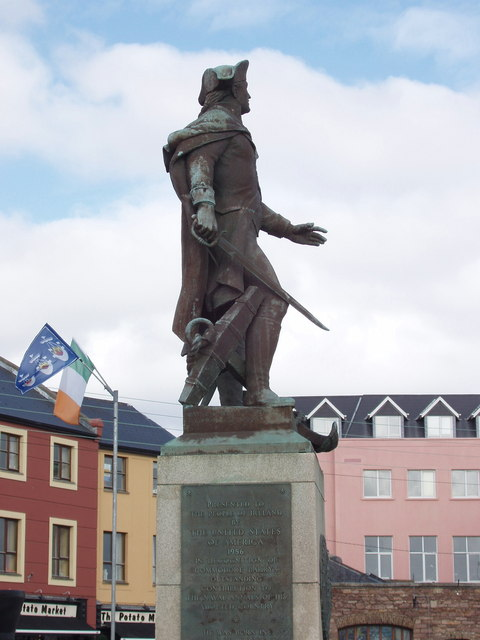
1956 statue of Barry in Wexford

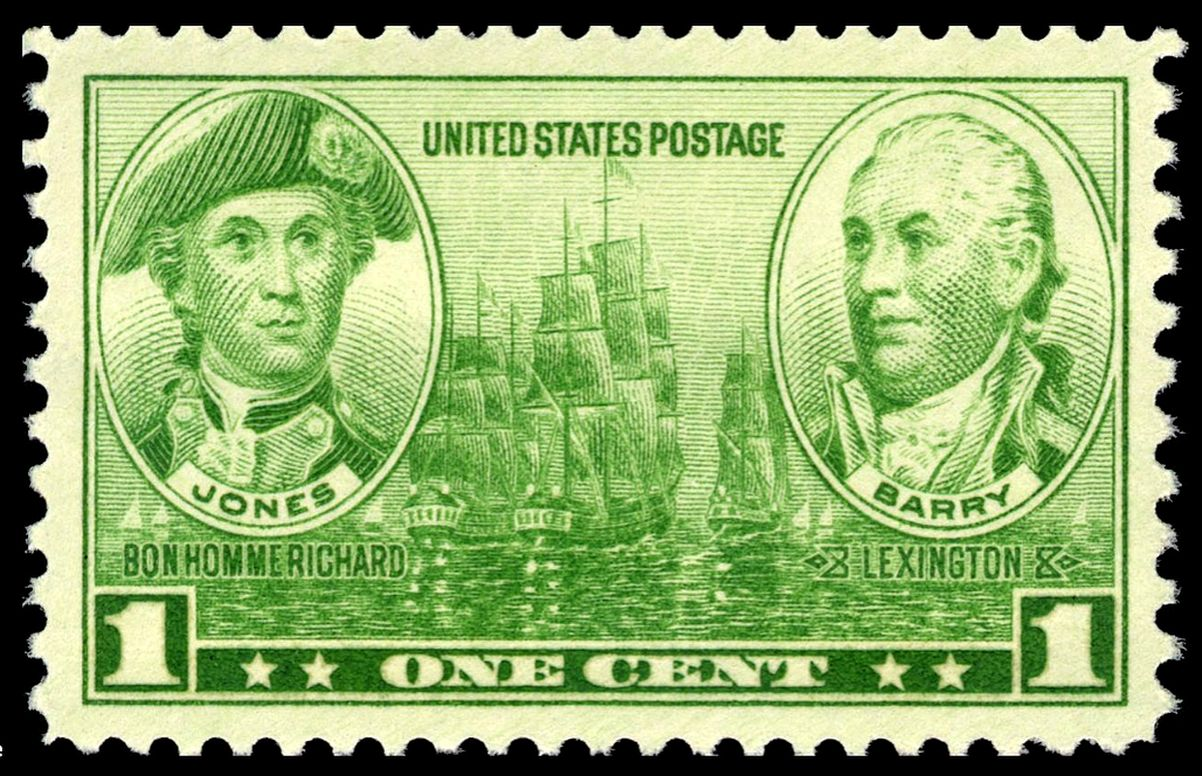
Barry and John Paul Jones on a U.S. postage stamp, Issue of 1936

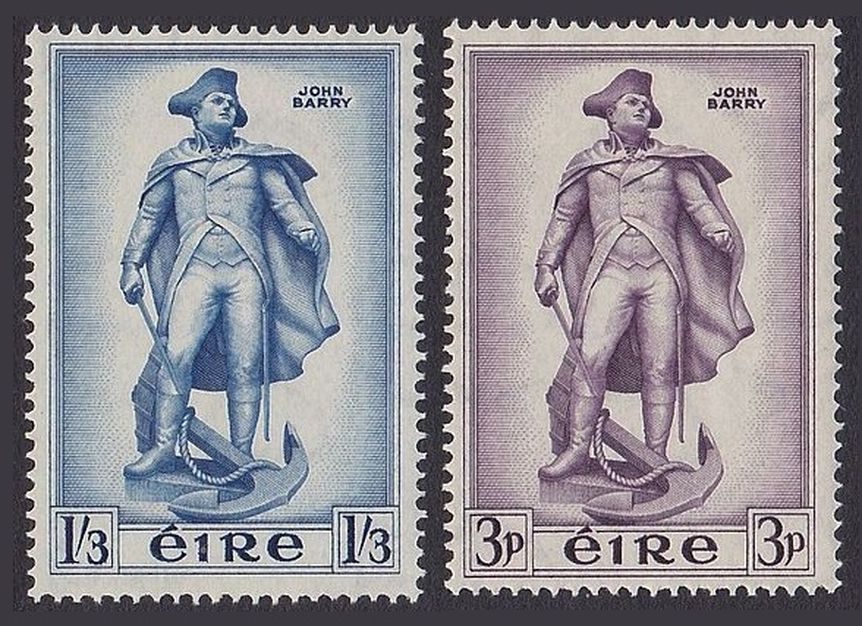
Barry on Irish postage stamps,
Issue of 1956

== See also ==
- Bibliography of early American naval history
- Commodore Stephen Decatur
- Commodore John Hazelwood
- Irish military diaspora
- William Brown (admiral), "Father of the Argentine Navy"
- List of people on stamps of Ireland
