= German submarine U-405 =

German World War II submarine

History

Nazi Germany
- Name: U-405
- Ordered: 16 October 1939
- Builder: Danziger Werft, Danzig
- Yard number: 106
- Laid down: 8 July 1940
- Launched: 4 June 1941
- Commissioned: 17 September 1941
- Fate: Sunk on 1 November 1943

General characteristics
- Class & type: Type VIIC submarine
- Displacement: 769 tonnes (757 long tons) surfaced; 871 t (857 long tons) submerged
- Length: 67.10 m (220 ft 2 in) o/a; 50.50 m (165 ft 8 in) pressure hull
- Beam: 6.20 m (20 ft 4 in) o/a; 4.70 m (15 ft 5 in) pressure hull
- Height: 9.60 m (31 ft 6 in)
- Draught: 4.74 m (15 ft 7 in)
- Installed power: 2,800–3,200 PS (2,100–2,400 kW; 2,800–3,200 bhp) (diesels); 750 PS (550 kW; 740 shp) (electric)
- Propulsion: 2 shafts; 2 × diesel engines; 2 × electric motors
- Speed: 17.7 knots (32.8 km/h; 20.4 mph) surfaced; 7.6 knots (14.1 km/h; 8.7 mph) submerged
- Range: 8,500 nmi (15,700 km; 9,800 mi) at 10 knots (19 km/h; 12 mph) surfaced; 80 nmi (150 km; 92 mi) at 4 knots (7.4 km/h; 4.6 mph) submerged
- Test depth: 230 m (750 ft); Crush depth: 250–295 m (820–968 ft)
- Complement: 4 officers, 40–56 enlisted
- Armament: 5 × 53.3 cm (21 in) torpedo tubes (four bow, one stern); 14 × torpedoes; 1 × 8.8 cm (3.46 in) deck gun (220 rounds); 1 x 2 cm (0.79 in) C/30 AA gun

Service record
- Part of: 8th U-boat Flotilla; 17 September 1941 – 28 February 1942; 1st U-boat Flotilla; 1 March – 30 June 1942; 11th U-boat Flotilla; 1 July 1942 – 28 February 1943; 6th U-boat Flotilla; 1 March – 1 November 1943
- Identification codes: M 35 435
- Commanders: K.Kapt. Rolf-Heinrich Hopman; 17 September 1941 – 1 November 1943
- Operations: 8 patrols: 1st patrol: 7 – 22 March 1942; 2nd patrol: a. 26 April – 10 May 1942; b. 12 – 15 May 1942; c. 20 – 22 May 1942; 3rd patrol: 16 July – 16 August 1942; 4th patrol: a. 26 August – 20 September 1942; b. 22 – 24 September 1942; c. 7 – 9 November 1942; 5th patrol: 11 November – 15 December 1942; 6th patrol: 7 February – 23 March 1943; 7th patrol: 2 – 21 May 1943; 8th patrol: a. 29 – 31 August 1943; b. 25 – 27 September 1943; c. 10 October 1943 – 1 November 1943
- Victories: 2 merchant ships sunk (11,841 GRT); 3 warships sunk (361 tons)

German submarine U-405 was a Type VIIC U-boat of Nazi Germany's Kriegsmarine during World War II.

The U-boat was laid down on 8 July 1940 at the Danziger Werft shipyard at Danzig, launched on 4 June 1941 and commissioned on 17 September 1941. She was commanded by Korvettenkapitän Rolf-Heinrich Hopman.

== Design ==
German Type VIIC submarines were preceded by the shorter Type VIIB submarines. U-405 had a displacement of 769 tonnes (757 long tons) when at the surface and 871 tonnes (857 long tons) while submerged. She had a total length of 67.10 m (220 ft 2 in), a pressure hull length of 50.50 m (165 ft 8 in), a beam of 6.20 m (20 ft 4 in), a height of 9.60 m (31 ft 6 in), and a draught of 4.74 m (15 ft 7 in). The submarine was powered by two Germaniawerft F46 four-stroke, six-cylinder supercharged diesel engines producing a total of 2,800 to 3,200 metric horsepower (2,060 to 2,350 kW; 2,760 to 3,160 shp) for use while surfaced, two Siemens-Schuckert GU 343/38–8 double-acting electric motors producing a total of 750 metric horsepower (550 kW; 740 shp) for use while submerged. She had two shafts and two 1.23 m (4 ft) propellers. The boat was capable of operating at depths of up to 230 metres (750 ft).

The submarine had a maximum surface speed of 17.7 knots (32.8 km/h; 20.4 mph) and a maximum submerged speed of 7.6 knots (14.1 km/h; 8.7 mph). When submerged, the boat could operate for 80 nautical miles (150 km; 92 mi) at 4 knots (7.4 km/h; 4.6 mph); when surfaced, she could travel 8,500 nautical miles (15,700 km; 9,800 mi) at 10 knots (19 km/h; 12 mph). U-405 was fitted with five 53.3 cm (21 in) torpedo tubes (four fitted at the bow and one at the stern), fourteen torpedoes, one 8.8 cm (3.46 in) SK C/35 naval gun, 220 rounds, and a 2 cm (0.79 in) C/30 anti-aircraft gun. The boat had a complement of between forty-four and sixty.

== Service history ==
After her commissioning, U-405 joined the 8th U-boat Flotilla for training, before serving with the 1st, 11th and 6th U-boat flotillas under operational conditions.

=== Patrol history ===
Of her eight war patrols, only on the sixth did U-405 sink any ships. On 28 February 1943, south-west of Iceland, she sank the 7,176 GRT American liberty ship SS Wade Hampton. A straggler from Convoy HX 227, Wade Hampton was en route to Murmansk from New York, carrying 8,000 tons of general cargo as well as two PT boats (RPT-1 and RPT-3).

Nine days later, on 9 March 1943, U-405 sank the 4,665 GRT Norwegian ship Bonneville which was en route from New York to Liverpool as part of Convoy SC 121, and carrying 7,196 tons of general cargo, explosives and the tank landing craft HMS LCT-2341 as deck cargo.

After this success, U-405's seventh war patrol began badly, when at 19.24 hours on 4 May 1943, only two days out of Saint-Nazaire, the boat was attacked in the Bay of Biscay by a British Halifax GR.II Series IA bomber of 502 Squadron, RAF Coastal Command. The aircraft dropped three bombs, causing an oil leak that could not be repaired, prompting the captain to abort the patrol on 12 May. While returning home, on 18 May, northwest of Cape Finisterre, U-405 was bombed again, this time by an Australian Sunderland patrol bomber of 10 Squadron, although she escaped without any damage.

=== Sinking ===
On the 23rd day of her eighth and final patrol, 1 November 1943, U-405 was engaged by the destroyer USS Borie at 49°00′N 31°14′W. The destroyer initially fired depth charges, after which U-405 came (and was probably forced) to the surface. Borie then rammed U-405. After the ramming, Borie was high-centered on top of U-405, and until they separated, exchanges of small arms fire took place. This was a unique battle: unlike other modern naval actions, it was decided by ramming and small arms fire at extremely close range.

Normally, in a surface engagement the superior armament and greater reserve buoyancy of the destroyer would have been decisive. But in this unusual case, the destroyer was unable to depress her 4-inch (100 mm) and 3-inch (76 mm) guns enough to engage, while all of the submarine's armament could be brought to bear. Borie's crew had a limited number of small arms, the German deck mounts were completely open and had no protection. In the extended and bitter fighting that ensued, dozens of German sailors were killed in desperate attempts to man the 8.8 cm (3.5 in) deck gun. Their casualties included those struck by a sheath-knife and a 4-inch cartridge case.

At this point, about 35 of the German crew of 49 had been killed or lost overboard. Borie had been badly damaged and was moving at a reduced speed, while the submarine was still capable of maneuvering at a similar speed. U-405's tighter turning radius effectively prevented Borie from bringing her superior firepower to bear; Hopman did a masterful job of maneuvering his badly damaged boat with his remaining crew. Borie shut-off her searchlight, her crew hoping that U-405 would attempt to escape and provide a better target for her guns. The submarine did indeed attempt to speed away, and Borie switched her searchlight back on and turned to bring her guns and a depth charge thrower to bear. The submarine was bracketed by shallow-set depth charges and struck by a 4-inch shell, and came to a stop. Borie's crew observed about 14 sailors signalling their surrender and abandoning ship in yellow rubber rafts. Hutchins gave the order to cease fire; several of them were apparently wounded, being loaded into the rafts on stretchers by their shipmates.

The last to leave the stricken ship was wearing an officer's cap. U-405 sank slowly by the stern at 0257. She was seen to explode underwater, probably from scuttling charges set by the last officer to leave. Hutchins reported later:

"When the submarine sank, there was a yell that went up from all hands — it probably could be heard in Berlin. The men were clasping each other and patting each other on the back, and all during the action, there were times when it was actually comical to observe the situation, particularly with the submarine pinned underneath … heretofore their one dream had been to catch a submarine, depth charge him, bring him to the surface and then to sink him with gunfire, this particular action more than justified their hopes."

The survivors were observed firing Very star-shells: Borie's crew believed this to be a distress signal, and maneuvered in an attempt to recover them from their rubber rafts, as they approached to 50-60 yards off the port bow. But as it turned out, the Germans were signalling another surfaced U-boat, which answered with a star-shell of her own.

A Borie lookout reported a torpedo passing close by from that U-boat, Borie had no choice but to protect herself by sailing away. She was forced to sail through U-405's rafts as she turned away from the other U-boat, but the men on the rafts were observed firing another Very flare as Borie steamed away in a radical zigzag pattern. No German survivors were ever recovered by either side; all 49 crewmen were lost.

Borie lost three officers and 27 crew members, and was too badly damaged by the collision to be towed to port. The next day, her crew was ordered to abandon ship and she was sunk by USS Barry.

=== Wolfpacks ===
U-405 took part in nine wolfpacks, namely:

- Wrangel (11 – 18 March 1942)
- Strauchritter (2 – 5 May 1942)
- Nebelkönig (27 July – 14 August 1942)
- Trägertod (12 – 18 September 1942)
- Boreas (19 November – 9 December 1942)
- Neptun (18 February – 3 March 1943)
- Westmark (6 – 11 March 1943)
- Siegfried (25 – 27 October 1943)
- Siegfried 1 (27 – 30 October 1943)

== Summary of raiding history ==
Date	Ship Name	Nationality	Tonnage (Note: Merchant ship tonnages are in gross register tons. Military vessels are listed by tons displacement.)	Fate
28 February 1943	RPT-1 (Note: Being carried aboard Wade Hampton)	Soviet Navy	35	Sunk
28 February 1943	RPT-3	Soviet Navy	35	Sunk
28 February 1943	Wade Hampton	United States	7,176	Sunk
9 March 1943	Bonneville	Norway	4,665	Sunk
9 March 1943	HMS LCT 2341 (Note: Being carried aboard Bonneville)	Royal Navy	291	Sunk

== Bibliography ==
- Busch, Rainer; Röll, Hans-Joachim (1999). German U-boat commanders of World War II : a biographical dictionary. Translated by Brooks, Geoffrey. London, Annapolis, Md: Greenhill Books, Naval Institute Press. ISBN 1-55750-186-6.
- Busch, Rainer; Röll, Hans-Joachim (1999). Deutsche U-Boot-Verluste von September 1939 bis Mai 1945 [German U-boat losses from September 1939 to May 1945]. Der U-Boot-Krieg (in German). Vol. IV. Hamburg, Berlin, Bonn: Mittler. ISBN 3-8132-0514-2.
- Edwards, Bernard (1996). Dönitz and the Wolf Packs – The U-boats at War. Cassell Military Classics. p. 171. ISBN 0-304-35203-9.
- Gröner, Erich; Jung, Dieter; Maass, Martin (1991). U-boats and Mine Warfare Vessels. German Warships 1815–1945. Vol. 2. Translated by Thomas, Keith; Magowan, Rachel. London: Conway Maritime Press. ISBN 0-85177-593-4.
- Kemp, Paul (1999). U-Boats Destroyed – German Submarine Losses in the World Wars. London: Arms & Armour. ISBN 1-85409-515-3.
