= Wolfpack Hai =

Hai (English : "Shark") was a wolfpack of German U-boats that operated from 3 to 21 July 1942 in the Battle of the Atlantic during World War II. They attacked the Liverpool to Freetown, Sierra Leone convoy OS-33, sinking eight ships for a total of 61,125 gross register tons (GRT).

== U-boats, commanders and dates ==
- U-136, Heinrich Zimmermann, 3–11 July (sunk)
- U-201, Adalbert Schnee, 3–20 July
- U-116, Werner von Schmidt, 3–21 July
- U-572, Heinz Hirsacker, 3–21 July
- U-582, Werner Schulte, 3–21 July
- U-752, Karl-Ernst Schroeter, 3–21 July

== Ships hit by this Wolfpack ==
=== Avila Star ===
At 00:36 on 6 July, after chasing her for five hours, U-201 hit the unescorted 14,443-ton British Blue Star Line passenger ship Avila Star with two G7e torpedoes 90 miles east of São Miguel, Azores. Another torpedo was fired at 00:54 and failed to explode, but another, four minutes later, delivered the coup de grâce. The ship capsized and sank an hour later. The master, 66 crew and 17 passengers were lost, and the remaining 112 (93 crewmen, 6 gunners and 13 passengers) were later rescued.

=== Cortona ===
At 00:22 on 12 July, the 7,093-ton British merchant ship Cortona, dispersed from Convoy OS-33, was struck by a torpedo from U-116, and three minutes later by another from U-201. Another torpedo from U-201 struck amidships at 00:41 and caused the ship to sink after about an hour. Of the crew, 29 men and 2 gunners were lost, while the master, 18 crew and 4 gunners were picked up in their lifeboat ten days later by the destroyer HMS Pathfinder.

=== Port Hunter ===
At 01:47 on 12 July the 8,826-ton British merchant ship Port Hunter of Convoy OS-33 was struck by a torpedo from U-582. The ship, whose cargo included ammunition and depth charges, suffered several heavy detonations, and sank within two minutes. The master, 68 crew, 14 gunners, and 5 passengers were lost, the only survivors being three crewmen who had been sleeping on deck, who were blown into the water and survived by clinging to wreckage until rescued by HMS Rother after seven hours in the sea.

=== Shaftesbury ===
At 09:45 on 12 July, the 4,284-ton British merchant ship Shaftesbury dispersed from Convoy OS-33 was hit by two torpedoes from U-116 and sank in 15 minutes. There were no losses among the crew, although the master, Uriel Eynon, was taken prisoner by the U-boat, returned to Germany, and held at the Milag Nord POW camp.

=== Siris ===
At 04:13 on 12 July, the 5,242-ton British merchant ship Siris, dispersed from convoy OS-33, was hit by a torpedo from U-201. Damaged and alone, she finally sank at 06:26 after the U-boat surfaced and fired 100 rounds from her deck gun at the ship. In the attack a crewman and two gunners were killed, while the master, 46 crew and five gunners abandoned ship, and were picked up ten days later by HMS Jonquil.

=== Sithonia ===
At 02:21 on 13 July, the 6,723-ton British merchant ship Sithonia, dispersed from convoy OS-33, was torpedoed and sunk by U-201, killing 7 of the crew. The master and 20 men made landfall at Timiris, Senegal, after 18 days at sea, and were interned by the Vichy French, while the chief officer and 24 men were picked up by a Spanish fishing vessel after 14 days.

=== British Yeoman ===
U-201 struck again at 01:46 on 15 July, sinking the unescorted 6,990-ton British tanker British Yeoman with a single torpedo after chasing her for about 14 hours. The tanker, loaded with 9,700 tons of Admiralty fuel oil, immediately caught fire. The next morning the U-boat returned to the scene of the attack and found the stern of the ship still floating, and sank it with 61 rounds from her deck gun. Only 10 of the crew of 53 survived.

=== Empire Attendant ===
At 03:30 on 15 July U-582 torpedoed and sank the 7,524-ton British merchant ship Empire Attendant south of the Canary Islands. There were no survivors from her crew of 59.

== Bibliography ==
- Edwards, Bernard (1996). Dönitz and the Wolf Packs - The U-boats at War. Cassell Military Classics. pp. 117, 119, 123–125. ISBN 0-304-35203-9.
