= USS Barry (DD-2) =

United States Navy destroyer (1902–1908)

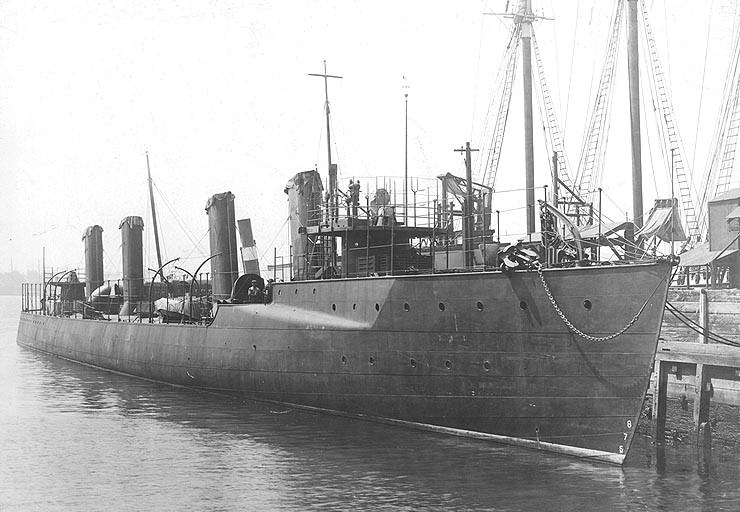
- USS Barry in port soon after completion, c. 1902–1903.

History

United States
- Name: Barry
- Namesake: Commodore John Barry
- Ordered: 4 May 1898
- Awarded: 1 October 1898
- Builder: Neafie and Levy Ship and Engine Building Company of Philadelphia, Pennsylvania
- Laid down: 2 September 1899
- Launched: 22 March 1902
- Commissioned: 24 November 1902
- Decommissioned: 2 April 1908
- Commissioned: 21 December 1908
- Decommissioned: 21 October 1912
- Commissioned: 24 June 1913
- Decommissioned: 28 June 1919
- Stricken: 15 September 1919
- Fate: Sold 3 January 1920 and scrapped

General characteristics
- Class & type: Bainbridge-class destroyer
- Displacement: 420 long tons (430 t) (standard); 592 long tons (601 t) (full load)
- Length: 245 ft (74.7 m) (pp); 250 ft (76.2 m) (oa)
- Beam: 23 ft 7 in (7.2 m)
- Draft: 6 ft 6 in (2 m) (mean)
- Installed power: 4 × Thornycroft boilers; 8,000 ihp (6,000 kW)
- Propulsion: 2 × Vertical triple expansion engines; 2 × Propellers
- Speed: 29 kn (54 km/h; 33 mph) (designed speed); 28.13 kn (52.10 km/h; 32.37 mph) (On trials)
- Complement: 3 officers; 72 enlisted men
- Armament: 2 × 3 in (76 mm)/50 caliber guns; 5 × 6-pounder (57 mm (2.2 in)) guns; 2 × 18 in (457 mm) torpedo tubes

USS Barry, was a Bainbridge-class destroyer, she was the first ship of the United States Navy to be named for Commodore John Barry (1745–1803).

== Construction ==
Barry was launched on 22 March 1902, by Neafie and Levy Ship and Engine Building Company of Philadelphia; sponsored by Miss Charlotte Adams Barnes the great-grandniece of Commodore Barry: and commissioned on 24 November 1902, Lieutenant Noble Edward Irwin in command.

== Service history ==
=== Commissioning ===
Barry was assigned to the 1st Torpedo Flotilla, Coast Squadron, North Atlantic Fleet, and during the summer of 1903 participated in maneuvers off the New England coast.

=== Transfer to the Far East ===
Setting out on 23 December 1903, the flotilla proceeded by way of Puerto Rico and the Canary Islands to Gibraltar where it arrived on 27 January 1904. Resuming the voyage on 31 January, the warships stopped at Algiers for a week in early February. On 9 February, they arrived at Valletta, Malta, where the flotilla and Buffalo had to lay over for a fortnight while Barry went into dry dock to have her propellers repaired after damaging them while mooring. Transiting the Suez Canal on 26 February, the flotilla stayed at Port Suez, Egypt, until the 29th when it headed down the Red Sea to Aden. In March, Barry and her companions visited Bombay, India, and Colombo, Ceylon. They made the last stop before reaching their destination, a port call at Singapore, between 3 and 9 April. The flotilla then made the relatively short final leg of the voyage, from Singapore to Cavite in the Philippines, on 9 April 1904.

=== "Show the flag" - China 1905–1906 ===
On 1 July 1905, Barry stood out of Manila Bay with the flotilla to accompany the battleship and cruiser squadrons on the annual northern redeployment to conduct summer exercises and to "show the flag" in Chinese waters. The first portion of the normal summer drills and port visits went off as usual; but, early in August, China displayed another burst of nationalism when a boycott was organized in response to the Chinese exclusion policy then in effect on the American west coast. Initially, this brought little disruption to the Asiatic Fleet's routine. The warships carried out their exercises and visited Chinese ports as usual. The destroyers even returned south to the Philippines in October according to custom. Only then came the break with normal routine. Instead of passing the winter months in the Philippines, Barry and Bainbridge spent just six weeks there before returning north to China late in November after President Theodore Roosevelt chose to brandish the "Big Stick".

The mission lasted through the winter with the destroyers joining other ships of the Asiatic Fleet in repeated calls at Chinese ports in a vigorous display of the naval might of the United States. By the spring of 1906, the Chinese national feeling against the United States had subsided so that, though Barry and Bainbridge remained in Chinese waters and continued to "show the flag," they were also able to resume many of the normal training evolutions more typical of their annual summer sojourns in Chinese waters. Her stay in northern waters thus continued through the summer and into the fall. At the end of September, Barry and Bainbridge left Chefoo, China, in company with Chattanooga to return to the Philippines for the first time since the previous fall. After stopping off at Amoy, China, from 3 to 8 October, the warships arrived back at Cavite on the 10th.

=== Asiatic Station ===
On the Asiatic Station she served with the 1st Torpedo Flotilla, Battleship Squadron, until August 1917, except for two short periods (2 April – 21 December 1908 and on 21 October 1912 – 24 June 1913) out of commission.

=== World War I ===
On 1 August 1917, Barry stood out of Cavite with the rest of her division and embarked on the long voyage to Europe. She steamed by way of Borneo, Singapore, Ceylon, and India, making extended pauses at Columbo, Ceylon, where the division had to wait for Barry to repair a damaged propeller, and at Bombay, India, before reaching the southern terminus of the Suez Canal on 23 September. The division transited the canal on 25 September arriving at Port Said, Egypt, early in the afternoon. After a week at Port Said, Barry headed across the Mediterranean with the division. She steamed with the division to Malta, arriving in Valletta on 6 October and leaving again the following day escorting some ships to Naples. On the 9th, Barry and her division mates saw the merchant ships safely into Naples where they stood down for almost a week. She and her colleagues stood out of Naples on the last leg of their voyage on 15 October and reached their new base at Gibraltar on the 20th.

She escorted merchantmen in the Mediterranean until August 1918 and arrived at Charleston, South Carolina on 5 September. She remained there until the end of the year performing patrol and convoy duties. In January 1919, she left for the Philadelphia Navy Yard where she was decommissioned on 28 June and sold on 3 January 1920 to Henry A. Hitner's Sons Company of Philadelphia.

== Noteworthy commanding officers ==
- Lieutenant Noble Edward Irwin (24 March 1902 – 7 July 1905) (Later Rear Admiral)
- Lieutenant Adolphus Eugene Watson (27 March 1906 – 8 January 1907) (Later Rear admiral)

== Bibliography ==
=== Books ===
- Friedman, Norman (1982). U.S. Destroyers: An Illustrated History. Annapolis, Maryland: Naval Institute Press. ISBN 0-87021-733-X.
- Ships' Data, U. S. Naval Vessels, 1911-. US Naval Department. 1 January 1914.

=== Online resources ===
- "Barry I (Destroyer No. 2)". Dictionary of American Naval Fighting Ships. Naval History and Heritage Command. 23 June 2015.
- Willshaw, Fred. "USS BARRY (DD-2)". NavSource.
- Mann, Raymond A. (22 June 2015). "Bainbridge II (Torpedo-boat Destroyer No. 1)". Dictionary of American Naval Fighting Ships. Naval History and Heritage Command.
