= Gruppe Monsun =

Military unit

gruppe Monsun
- Part of the Indian Ocean Theatre
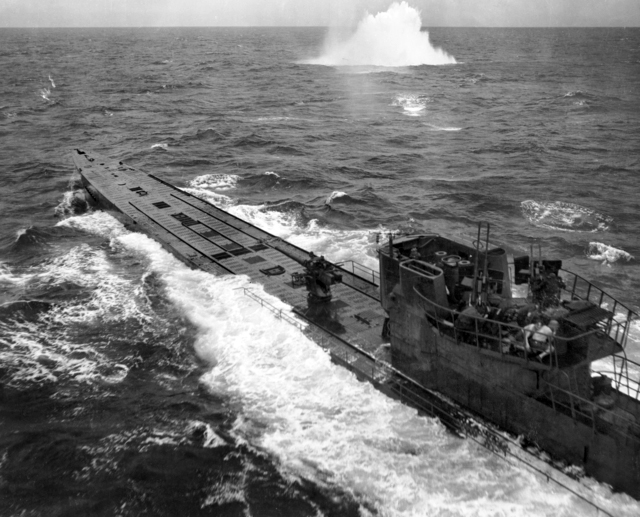
- The Type IXD U-boat U-848 was on its way to join gruppe Monsun when it was photographed in the Atlantic by an attacking American aircraft. After bomb-damage stopped it from diving, it was sunk with all hands.
- Operational scope: Blockade running and commerce raiding
- Type: Naval
- Location: Indian Ocean, South Atlantic, North Atlantic
- Planned: Kriegsmarine and Imperial Japanese Navy
- Date: 11 June 1943 – 9 May 1945
- Outcome: Failure

Gruppe Monsun (Monsoon Group) was a force of German U-boats (submarines) that operated in the Pacific and Indian Oceans during the Second World War. Although similar naming conventions were used for temporary groupings of submarines in the Atlantic, the longer duration of Indian Ocean patrols caused the name to be permanently associated with the relatively small number of U-boats operating from Penang (primarily its capital, George Town).

After 1944, the U-boats of gruppe Monsun were placed under the authority of the Southeast Asia U-boat Region. The Indian Ocean was the only place where German and Japanese forces fought in the same theatre. To avoid incidents between Germans and Japanese, attacks on other submarines were forbidden. Altogether 41 U-boats of all types, including transports, were sent, many of these were lost and few returned to Europe.

== Background ==
=== Indian Ocean trade routes ===
Map of the Indian Ocean

The Indian Ocean was strategically important, containing the British Raj (now Pakistan, India, Sri Lanka and Bangladesh). The region contained strategic raw materials and the shipping routes that the British needed for their economy. Early in the war, German merchant raiders and pocket battleships had sunk a number of merchant ships in the Indian Ocean. Later on, it became harder for them to operate in the area and by 1942 most were either sunk or dispersed.

From 1941, U-boats were considered for deployment to this area but due to the First Happy Time (July 1940 − October 1940/April 1941) and Second Happy Time (January−August 1942) it was decided that sending U-boats to the Indian Ocean would be an unnecessary diversion. There were also no foreign bases in which units could operate from and be supplied and would be operating at the limits of their range.

Japan's entry into the war in 1941 led to the capture of European south-east Asian colonies including British Malaya and the Dutch East Indies. In May and June 1942, Japanese submarines began operating in the Indian Ocean and engaged British forces in the Battle of Madagascar (5 May – 6 November 1942). The British had invaded the Vichy-controlled island to prevent it from falling into Japanese hands.

=== Overland trade ===
70th meridian east (interactive map)

With the USSR neutral, rubber was imported to Germany via Japanese ships to Dairen (now Dalian) and the Trans-Siberian Railway but not once Germany invaded the USSR. The German invasion of the Soviet Union in 1941 closed the overland routes for the delivery of rubber, tungsten, tin and otherstrategic materials from south-east Asia to Germany. Blockade-running ships managed to avoid Allied patrols in the North Atlantic in 1941 and 1942.

A German–Japanese trade deal was struck in January 1943 after much haggling, did little to help either side. Relations were troubled by arguments over how Japan was to pay for the use of German patents, yet the Japanese wanted the swapping of military technology to continue. Japanese submarines, designed for the Pacific, made better transports than the smaller German U-boats built for European waters. The Axis countries negotiated the Tripartite Pact on 27 September 1940, with later amendments, that amongst other things provided for a demarcation line in the Indian Ocean at the 70th meridian east.

=== Blockade-running ships ===
German blockade running had been made much easier after the Battle of France and the occupation of the French Atlantic ports. The Japanese were willing to carry rubber to Japan to be transferred to German blockade-running ships. Ermland arrived in Europe on 3 April 1941 and to the middle of 1942, the German blockade-runners enjoyed a fair degree of success. A year later, the British began a campaign against the blockade-runners in the spring, when RAF Coastal Command obtained the use of longer-ranged aircraft, when loans of aircraft from RAF Bomber Command began. Coastal Command lost five aircraft for one damaged blockade-runner, a dismal exchange.

In October 1942, British aircraft patrols to identify potential blockade-runners for submarines to attack them began. The Germans planned to send 32 German and Italian vessels with 440,000 long tons (450,000 t) of cargo to Europe from August 1942 to May 1943 but this had to be cut to 140,000 long tons (140,000 t) of cargo and 70,000 long tons (71,000 t) of edible oils. Thirteen merchant ships and two tankers departed from the Far East but four turned back and seven were sunk. Thirteen ships and four tankers sailed from France and ten reached Japan but only contained 24,000 long tons (24,000 t) of goods. Allied efforts to intercept German blockade-runners had more success in the first half of 1943 when more ships and long-range aircraft were available to patrol. The Allied effort against the blockade-runners was intensified and several more runners were sunk.

=== Check-mate system ===
Using the Check-mate system, an Allied maritime reconnaissance aircraft or a ship had a Merchant Ship Description Code and Merchant Ship Silhouette Characteristics Register, the merchant ship forecast and secret signal to identify a ship. If unsatisfactory, a signal in clear was sent to the local commander-in-chief, "EMERGENCY CHECK, ship signal letters, apparent name, position" that received a reply in a few minutes that was Mate True (the ship could be genuine) Mate False (could not be genuine) or Mate Doubtful (investigate further). On many occasions, genuine ships took no notice of challenges until a naval ship was in hailing distance that was dangerous to the naval ship in the case of a blockade-runner but a warning shot usually galvanised merchant captains. If a blockade-runner was uncovered, rapid fire was opened at the bridge and lifeboats to sink the ship, if necessary, Allied resources by then precluding the need to hijack the cargo. Rescues of survivors were permitted but there was a presumption that they would be left as bait, to induce Axis ships and U-boats to attempt a rescue. Aircraft were to summon help from ships. The only option for Axis ships was to be unseen and that meant using submarines to evade scrutiny.

By mid-1943, the prospects for Axis blockade running by ships had declined. Allied ports on the Atlantic and Indian Ocean coasts had been reinforced with ships and longer-range aircraft. The US Fourth Fleet (Vice-Admiral Jonas Ingram) had begun operating off the South American coast. No ship could evade air reconnaissance with radar, penetrating the night and bad weather, backed up with more ships to be guided to interceptions. In these circumstances bluff had lost its effect. In June 1943 the British began to use the Check-mate system, a daily forecast of the position of every independently-sailing merchant ship on earth. Hitherto, naval ships were informed of the ships they were likely to encounter and the information was revised through wireless signals. Despite this precaution, unexpected yet genuine ships were met, not reported to some commands. Only half of the British ships challenged answered with their secret signal and non-English-speaking merchant officers, even less often. Ship names could be spelt wrong and not show in alphabetical lists that might not contain a name-change. Axis intelligence services informed blockade-running captains what ships to pose as in certain sea areas.

=== Cargo submarines ===
Submarines had been used as transports since 1940 and the Kriegsmarine had used bigger U-minelayers as improvised tankers and supply vessels to keep the smaller Type VII submarines at sea for longer. New construction was begun for specialist U-boats, the Type VIIF carried a cargo of 25 torpedoes, two Type IXD1 boats were fitted with high-speed diesel engines that were not a success, ten Type XIV submarines carried 432 long tons (439 t) of fuel. The Type XV submarine and Type XVI submarine were mammoth in size but were never built and Type XXI submarine variants were proposed but also came to nothing.

The Japanese Navy used submarines to supply distant garrisons, with landing craft, inflatable boats and tanks on deck for carrying stores to the shore. Twelve I361-class boats weer built that carried 60 long tons (61 t) of cargo internally and 22 long tons (22 t) externally. The submarine I-373 carried 260 long tons (260 t) including 150 long tons (150 t) of petrol and the Ha-101-class also carried 60 long tons (61 t) of stores. The Japanese army built their own submarines, 24 Yu-1-class, ten Yu-1001-class and two Yu-2001-class. While not intended as merchant ships the Japanese Navy demonstrated the utility of submarine transport between Asia and Europe.

The large submarines of the Regia Marina (Italian Royal Navy) had proved ineffective in the Atlantic. Alpino Bagnolini, Barbarigo, Comandante Cappellini, (renamed Aquilla III in May 1943) Giuseppe Finzi, Reginaldo Giuliani, Enrico Tazzoli and Luigi Torelli were converted to transport submarines. The conversions were to sail from BETASOM (Bordeaux) with trade goods for Japan, rendezvousing with merchant ships south-east of Madagascar, the normal maximum range for U-boats operating off the South African coast, where they fuelled from Milchkuh (milk cow) tankers, to transfer their cargoes and return to Europe.

== Prelude ==
=== Axis plans ===
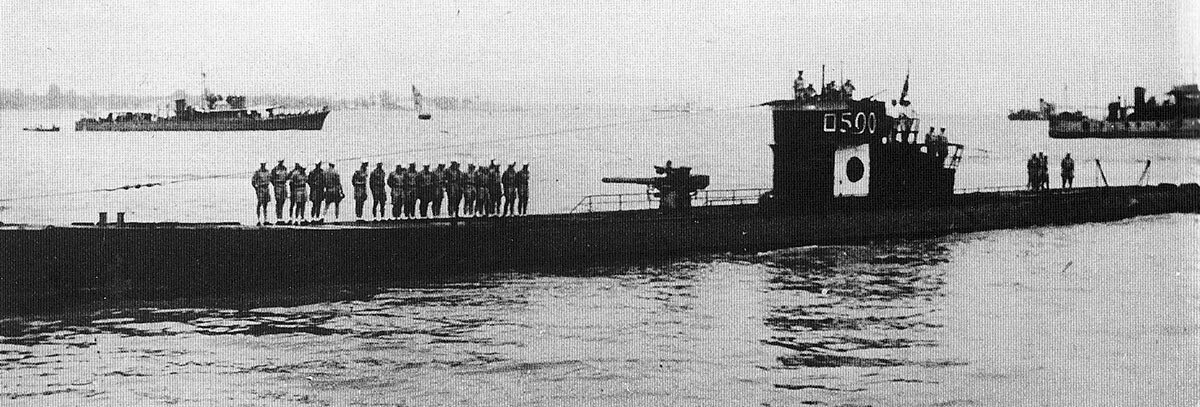
The former U-511 after being presented to Japan as IJN Ro-500.

The Indian Ocean appeared to be a promising area of attack for the German U-boat arm, where the British lacked bases. In December 1942 the Japanese had offered the Kriegsmarine the use of bases at Penang and Sabang. On 28 December, the Seekriegsleitung (Naval War Command) accepted the Japanese offer but until the defeats in the Atlantic in May 1943 German enthusiasm for such a venture was tepid. As no supplies were available at either location, the idea was turned down, although a number of U-boats operated around the Cape of Good Hope. Cappellini reached the East Indies (11 May − 9 July) and was met by the sloop Eritrea. A second base was established at Kobe and small repair bases were located at Singapore, Batavia (now Jakarta) and Surabaya. As part of the dispersal of U-boat operations following the losses in the North Atlantic in early 1943, Wilhelm Dommes was ordered to sail U-178 from his operating area off South Africa to assume command at Penang.

=== Yanagi missions ===
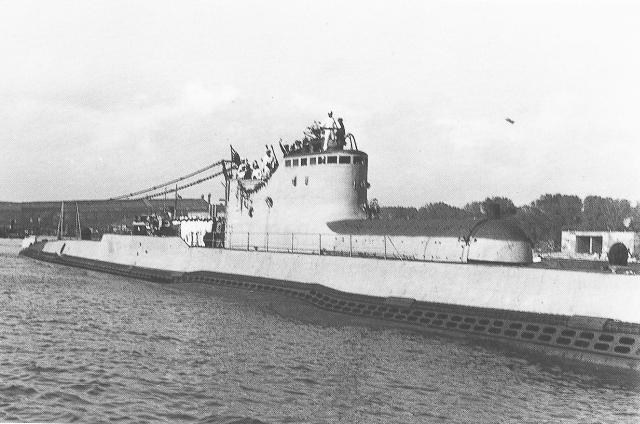
The Japanese submarine I-30 entering the port of Lorient (5 August 1942) on a Yanagi mission

The Japanese submarine I-30 (2,198 GRT) had an aircraft hangar forward of the conning tower and a range of 16,000 nmi (30,000 km; 18,000 mi) at 16 kn (30 km/h; 18 mph) on internal fuel. The submarine began the submerged transport of strategic materials between the Japanese empire and Nazi Germany on 20 April 1942. The commerce raiders Aikoku Maru and Hōkoku Maru accompanied and fuelled I-30 that reconnoitred ports in the Indian Ocean and then passed the Cape of Good Hope for the voyage to Europe. Escorted by German minesweepers in Unternehmen Kirschblüte (Operation Cherry Blossom) I-30 docked at Lorient on 5 August 1942, delivering 1,500 kg (3,300 lb) of mica and 660 kg (1,460 lb) of shellac. I-30 brought cargo back to the Indian Ocean and arrived at Penang on 9 September 1942, called at Singapore on 11 October but hit a mine two days later outside the port.

U-511 sailed from Lorient on 10 May 1943, disguised as Marco Polo I, to be transferred to the Imperial Japanese Navy, carrying cargo and six passengers, one being Admiral Naokuni Nomura. On 27 June, the U-boat sank Sebastian Cermeno, an un-escorted, 7,194 GRT, US Liberty ship. On 9 July, the 7,176 GRT US Liberty ship Samuel Heintzelman, carrying 5,644 long tons (5,735 t) of ammunition and other cargo was sunk with no survivors. Refuelling took place from U-460 and the boat arrived at Penang on 17 July. With a Japanese pilot and interpreter, the boat arrived at Japan on 16 September. The boat was re-named Ro-500 and became a training boat, after the Japanese had found it too complicated to copy. The crew returned as replacement personnel by ship to Penang on the west coast of the Malayan Peninsula, where a former British seaplane station was being adapted for Italian cargo boats and German cargo and operational U-boats.

The Japanese submarine I-8 (2,231 GRT) departed from Penang on the night of 26/27 June 1943, with its usual complement of 100 men plus 48 more to take over U-1224 under construction in Hamburg. The submarine rendezvoused with I-10 to fuel and U-161 to fit a German radar-warning set. I-8 was eased on its journey through the Bay of Biscay by British patrols keeping their distance against German glider-bomb attacks. The torpedo boats T22, T24 and T25 escorted I-8 into Lorient in late August. I-8 transferred to Brest on 5 September 1943 to load anti-aircraft guns, torpedo and aircraft engines and ten German technicians. A powerful escort force Unternehmen Flieder (Operation Lilac) escorted the submarine into deep water where it submerged to begin its voyage. I-8 survived an air attack in the Atlantic and an air and sea search from 10 to 14 November off South Africa, being tracked by its wireless signals by Huff-Duff. I-8 evaded the hunt by remaining under water during daylight, reaching Singapore on 5 December 1943.

By late 1943, British and Dutch submarines were patrolling in the Malacca Strait against Japanese coastal traffic and keep watch on the Penang base. The 2,198 GRT I-34 sailed on 12 November 1943 for Europe and was torpedoed by HMS Taurus the following day. The Japanese I-29 sailed 16 December 1943 on the same patrol then voyage to France with a cargo of rubber, tungsten and 2 long tons (2.0 t) of gold and arrived on 11 March 1944. I-29 left Bordeaux on 16 April 1944 with ten Enigma machines, newt German radar and radar receivers, Bolde and medicines; twelve officers and eight students were taken on for the trip home. The boat arrived at Penang on 14 July and en route to Singapore, near Luzon, was torpedoed by USS Sawfish on 26 July 1944.

=== Wolfpack Eisbär ===
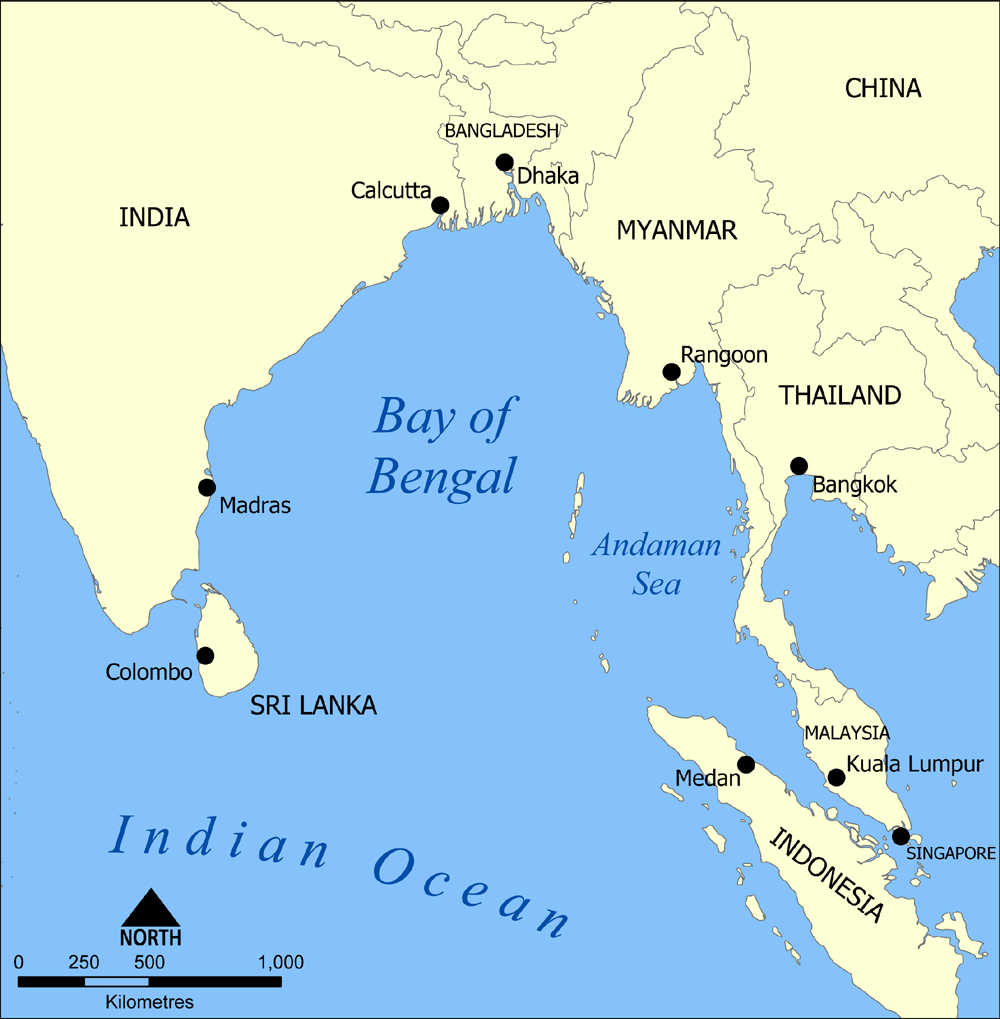
The Bay of Bengal and the Andaman Sea, Penang is in north-western Malaya

In August 1943, Admiral Karl Dönitz, the Befehlshaber der U-Boote (BdU, commander U-boats) concluded that operations around South Africa had run their course. In just under a year, U-boats had sunk 102 vessels within 1,000 nmi (1,900 km; 1,200 mi) of the South African coast for the loss of two U-boats. The quantity of sinkings had diminished since the first attacks in October 1942 and Allied anti-submarine warfare operations in the region had increased in extent and effectiveness. The Allied victory in North Africa had opened the Mediterranean for merchant ships, drastically reducing the importance of the Cape route to the Middle East. Dönitz had been defeated in the North Atlantic and resorted to harassing tactics, wherever inadequacies of the Allied anti-submarine effort could be found, until better U-boats, weapons and equipment, allowed a resumption of the Atlantic campaign.

=== Wolfpack Seehund ===
U-177 sailed from Bordeaux on 1 April 1943, carrying a Bachstelze (Wagtail) three-rotor, unpowered helicopter for searching and carried in canisters on the outside of the hull. Three men could assemble the Wagtail in ten minutes, launched and towed on a 1,000 ft (300 m) cable-and-winch system. With the U-boat making 15 kn (28 km/h; 17 mph) it could ascend to 1,500 ft (460 m) giving an observation radius of 25 mi (40 km). The Wagtail could be dismantled and stowed in five minutes and if the operation was disturbed by an aircraft, the Wagtail and pilot could be abandoned. On 28 May, off the Cape of Good Hope, U-177 came upon Convoy CD 20 (Cape Town to Durban) of 16 ships and the 6,700 GRT US ship Agwinonte and the Norwegian tanker Storaas (7,900 GRT). U-177 turned back to Saldanha Bay on the Western Cape, 65 mi (105 km) north-west of Cape Town and found another convoy in fog. While stalking the ships on 6 June the fog lifted abruptly and the U-boat was in the middle of the convoy, at which every gun that could bear opened fire and a Catalina attacked with three depth-charges, U-177 getting away but only just.

At a rendezvous with U-195 an ill member of the crew was transferred and then set of to meet Charlkotte Schliemann, arriving a day late on 23 June. After an outward voyage of 83 days, the sinking of two ships of 14,600 GRT the time was scant reward and the Wagtail reconnaissance flights had found nothing. The next stage of the voyage was an offensive patrol south of Madagascar, using the Wagtail and attacking three merchant ship from 5 to 10 July, missing the first ship and sinking the Canadian Jasper Park (7,200 GRT) then sinking the 7,200 GRT US ship Alice F. Palmer with torpedoes and gunfire. Moving south and south-east of Madagascar it took until 29 July to find a ship, the British Cornish City (5,000 GRT) and narrowly missed a US freighter, that was chased to within 60 nmi (110 km; 69 mi) of Madagascar, where on 5 August, the Wagtail spotted the Greek ship Efthalia Mari (4,200 GRT) that was sunk. The Wagtail pilot spotted another ship on the next day but it got away during an engine-room fire. U-177 began the return voyage to France and reached Bordeaux on 1 October after patrolling for 184 days.

U-178 sailed on 28 March 1943 and arrived off Cape Town in May but the U-boat sprung an oil leak and made distance to effect repairs. On closing with the coast on 24 May, a convoy was found but the U-boat was attacked and depth-charged by a Catalina. The U-boat crew returned fire but another Catalina appeared and Dommes dived, losing the convoy in consequence. At the end of May, Dommes picked up a report from U-177 that Convoy CD 20 was en route between Cape Town and Durban and found the convoy 60 nmi (110 km; 69 mi) south of Durban. The convoy had escorts and air cover but on 1 June U-178 damaged the 6,600 GRT Dutch freighter Salabangka, that was taken under tow but broke up in a storm. Having left the Mozambique Channel, Dommes rendezvoused with Charlotte Schliemann along with the six U-cruisers of the series; U-178 replenished fuel, oil, water and food from 21 to 26 June.

The U-cruisers received orders to stay in the Indian Ocean and make simultaneous attacks in dispersed areas, U-178 patrolling from south to north along the Mozambique Channel. On 4 July U-178 sank the 2,700 GRT Norwegian ship Breiviken and the 4,800 GRT Greek freighter Michael Livanos and fired six torpedoes at another ship but missed. U-178 lay in wait and from 11 to 16 July, sank the 4,800 GRT Greek freighter and Mary Livanos, the 7,200 GRT American Liberty ship Robert Bacon and the 6,700 GRT British freighter City of Canton, exhausting its stock of torpedoes. On 12 August U-178 was asked by BdU if it could reach Penang to refit and make a patrol on the homeward leg. Dommes replied that he could and met the Italian cargo boat Luigi Torelli, that had sailed on 18 June and refuelled it south of Madagascar. The boats made for Penang together, arriving on 29 August, U-178 having sunk six ships of 32,800 GRT. In 1944, Dommes was made Chef im Südraum, head of the Southeast Asia U-boat Region.

=== Regia Marina sailings ===
Island archipelagos in the eastern Atlantic

Comandante Cappellini sailed from Bordeaux (Betasom) on 11 May 1943 with up to twelve passengers, 160 long tons (160 t) of mercury, aluminium, welding steel, 20 mm guns, ammunition, bomb prototypes, bombsights and tank blueprints. After a rendezvous with the sloop Eritrea that escorted the submarine through the Molucca Strait, it reached Singapore on 13 July 1943. The cargo was swapped for 44 to 70 long tons (45 to 71 t) of zinc, 110 to 155 long tons (112 to 157 t) of rubber, 5 long tons (5.1 t) of tungsten, 2 long tons (2.0 t) of quinine, 2 long tons (2.0 t) of opium, bamboo, rattan and passengers but was seized by the Japanese when news of the Armistice of Cassibile broke.

Reginaldo Giuliani sailed with cargo on 16 May 1943 and reached Singapore on 1 August 1943, where it was seized in September after the armistice. Enrico Tazzoli sailed with cargo, on 21 May 1943, only to be sunk by aircraft in the Bay of Biscay. Barbarigo sailed with cargo, on 17 June 1943, also to be sunk by aircraft in the Bay of Biscay by 19 June. Luigi Torelli sailed on 18 June and to the south-east of the Cape of Good Hope, rendezvoused with U-178 a Type IXD2, that had been ordered not to make the return journey. The boats sailed together and reached Penang on 26 August, where Dommes, the U-boat captain, took command of Penang and its smaller bases at Singapore, Batavia (now Jakarta) Surabaya and Kobe.

Ammiraglio Cagni (1,504 GRT) sailed on 29 June, to attack ships off the South African east coast and the Mozambique Channel. Cagni made an abortive attack on a 4,000 GRT ship near the Canary Islands and made a similarly abortive attack on a convoy near Freetown. On 25 July, Cagni torpedoed and severely damaged HMS Asturias, a 22,048 GRT armed merchant cruiser, midway between Freetown and the St Paul Rocks. On 22 August, about 550 nmi (1,020 km; 630 mi) off Lüderitz Bay the captain received orders to head for Japan as swiftly as possible, then on 8 September, south-east of Mauritius, news of the Armistice of Cassibile arrived, Cagni steered for Durban and was escorted into the harbour by HMS Jasmine.

=== Monsun plan ===
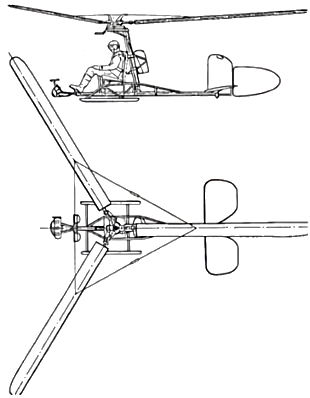
Focke-Achgelis Fa 330 Bachstelze (Wagtail)

With the base at Penang established, an ambitious operation was planned; as the U-boats were due to reach the Indian Ocean at the end of the monsoon season it was termed Monsun. Eleven boats were intended for the operation, three Type IXC U-boats, six type IXC/40 boats and two Type IXD2 U-cruisers (on their maiden patrols from Kiel) and a tanker U-boat as Gruppe Monsun. The U-boats were to avoid attention by ignoring routine targets and only attacking exceptionally important targets. When in the Indian Ocean they were to undertake normal patrols, gaining greater reconnaissance by using Focke-Achgelis Fa 330 Bachstelze (Wagtail) rotary kites to search from an altitude 400 ft (120 m) and fuelled by MV Brake and SS Charlotte Schliemann, the latter also carrying edible oils from south-east Asia to Japan. Once their torpedoes had been used, the Mosnun U-boats would refit and replenish at Penang and return with rubber, opium and other cargo. Food containers were made of zinc to be used once in Europe. Loaded with two torpedoes they would make the return journey. From May 1943, Italian cargo submarines, Japanese submarine operations and the Monsun boats set sail.

== Gruppe Monsun ==
=== Departures from France ===
The Type XIV U-cruiser U-847 departed Kiel on 6 July, hit an iceberg in the Denmark Strait and returned to Norway for repairs on 20 July, sailed again on 29 July was ordered to refuel U-boats returning from the Americas and West Africa. The boat reached its refuelling area in mid-August and was sunk on 27 August by two wildcats and an Avenger from USS Card dropped a Fido that sank the U-boat. With nine Type IX variants, Type IXC/40s and Type IXCs, the Type XIV U-tanker U-462 was to refuel them and sailed from France on 19 June 1943. On 12 July BdU ordered U-487 to travel 200 nmi (370 km; 230 mi) to the south-east to fuel U-648 heading for US waters and U-527. Once these tasks had been completed it was to refuel the remaining six Type IXC/40 boats on 23 July, another 350 nmi (650 km; 400 mi) to the south, then return to base. Before these orders could be fulfilled, on 13 July, it was attacked by a Wildcat and a Avenger from USS Core the Wildcat strafed the U-boat and the Avenger dropped four Torpex depth charges and then called for reinforcements. Core sent two Wildcats and four Avengers. The U-boat crew had recovered from its surprise and shot down one Wildcat but the Avengers sank the U-boat. The US destroyer USS Barker rescued 33 members of the crew but 27 were killed.

The Type IX boats sailed in early July with new, extensive, anti-aircraft equipments, sailing in groups on the surface; U-514 sailed on 3 July. On 8 July it was spotted in the Bay of Biscay by a Liberator of 224 Squadron Coastal Command. The U-boat was on the surface near Cape Finisterre, amidst Spanish fishing boats. The B-24 fired three rocket salvoes and the U-boat dived. The aircraft dropped a Mark 24 mine (Fido) homing torpedo but this went wrong. The bomber crew dropped two depth charges with shallow settings, that hit the Fido or the U-boat or both and the U-boat was not seen again. U-509 departed Lorient on 3 July and was attacked on 15 July near Madeira, north of the Canary Islands, by a Wildcat and a Avenger operating in combination from USS Santee. The Wildcat pilot strafed the U-boat that dived and the Avenger pilot dropped a Fido; the U-boat disappeared.

Example of a Grumman F4F Wildcat

U-506 sailed from Lorient on 6 July, on 12 July was detected on radar, about 300 nmi (560 km; 350 mi) to the west of Cape Finisterre, in the Bay of Biscay, by a US 1st Antisubmarine Squadron Liberator from Port Lyautey. The B-24 dived out of cloud and dropped seven depth charges, sinking the U-boat, six of the crew being rescued from a raft by British destroyers on 15 July, the other 49 crew being killed in the attack. Due to the amount of work given to U-487, U-160 was dispatched from the base at Bordeaux on 28 June to assist and was on the way to a rendezvous when U-487 was sunk. Well to the north of U-487 another Wildcat–Avenger combination, flying from Santee spotted the U-boat on 14 July. The Wildcat began its strafing run, followed by the Avenger that dropped depth charges. Despite orders to fight it out on the surface, the captain of U-160 dived and a Fido was dropped and was thought to have sunk the U-boat. The loss of U-160 made the German fuelling problem worse.

==== U-487 rendezvous ====
Eight U-boats had arrived at the rendezvous, some waiting for several days; when some boats contacted BdU it was assumed that U-487 had been sunk and expected that U-160 was to refuel U-516, U-532, U-533 and U-509 (that had already been sunk). U-155, heading for the Americas was to refuel U-168, U-183 and U-188 and then return to base. U-648, en route to the Americas, had its voyage cancelled and was to refuel U-527 and return with U-155. The boats intended to refuel from U-160 reported that it had not made rendezvous on 19 and 20 July and BdU assumed that it had been sunk. U-516, that had suffered mechanical faults that could not be repaired at sea, was ordered to refuel the three other boats on 26 July and then proceed south to meet U-662 and pass over ammunition and a Metox radar detector. U-516 refuelled U-532 and U-533 but could not find U-662 that had been sunk on 21 July. U-155 refuelled U-168, U-183 and U-188 on 23 July and on 24 July, U-306 on the way back from Freetown was also refuelled, both boat reaching Lorient on 11 August. U-648 met U-527 on 20 July, passed fuel and both sailed for France. Ultra decrypts and Huff-Duff alerted USS Bogue and aircraft found the two U-boats and U-648 dived deep and escaped; U-527 raced for a fog bank, engaging the aircraft with 20 mm-fire but was hit by four depth charges and sunk, 13 survivors going into the sea, later to be rescued by USS Clemson.

==== Indian Ocean rendezvous ====
Map of India

The five remaining boats of Monsun reached the Indian Ocean and rendezvoused with Brake on 8 September. As this was the day of the Italian armistice, BdU ordered German vessels out of the area in case the Italians betrayed the location to the Allies. The U-boats had to move several hundred miles further south, where they were refuelled and revictualled on 12 September, BdU assigning patrol areas. Allied code-breakers were able to follow the Monsun boats and divert shipping but U-168, sent to the Gulf of Cambay (now Gulf of Khambhāt) near Bombay (Mumbai) sank the British (2,200 GRT) ship Haiching by torpedo and six smaller vessels using its deck gun. During the night of 4/5 November a Catalina bombed the U-boat, preventing an attack on a convoy, reaching Penang on 11 November.

U-183 patrolled its area of Mombasa in Kenya and failed to sink a ship, the captain claiming that from 19 to 24 October, he fired eight electrical torpedoes, all of which missed or were unserviceable. U-188 patrolled the Gulf of Oman, sinking sank the 7,200 GRT US Liberty ship Cornelia P. Spencer and damaged a 10,000 GRT Norwegian tanker, Britannia. Near the southern point of India, U-532 sank two British and two Norwegian merchant ships of approximately 24,500 GRT. U-533, in the Gulf of Aden, sank nothing and on 16 October, a Bisley of 244 Squadron sank it in the Gulf of Oman, one man of the 53 crew surviving, washed ashore after 28 hours in the water. The four surviving U-boats went on to Penang, having sunk six ships and six sailing ships of about 33,000 GRT. The captain of U-183 was replaced at Penang. U-188 and U-532 returned to Europe; U-168 and U-183 were sunk in the Far East by the Allies.

=== Second wave 1943 ===
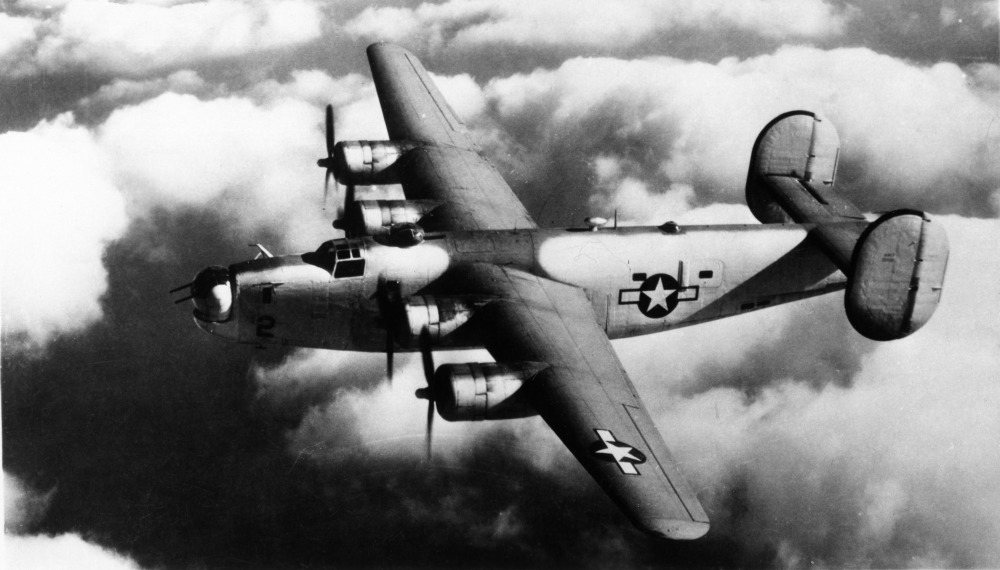
PB4Y-1 Liberator

A second wave of U-boats was sent from Europe to make up the losses suffered by gruppe Monsun. U-848 sailed on 18 September 1943 and sank the 4,600 GRT British freighter Baron Semple in the South Atlantic. The freighter alerted the US aircraft on Ascension Island that housed a detachment of four PB4Y1 Liberator bombers of the US Navy Bombing Squadron VB-107 from Natal in Brazil. On 5 November an aircraft spotted U-848, sent a contact report and made two runs, against return fire from the U-boat. The bomber dropped twelve depth charges that did much damage to the U-boat but it did not dive and trailed an oil slick.

The bomber pilot circled out of range and guided two more PB4Y1s to the area. The first bomber strafed the U-boat as one of the two other bombers made two runs over the U-boat and the third PB4Y1 attacked, was hit in an engine and had to make for Ascension. After circling for another four hours the PB4Y1 that had withdrawn, returned with three B-25 bombers, that attacked from 1,500 ft (460 m) with 500 lb (230 kg) bombs, to no effect. The PB4Y1 that had returned made another two bombing runs with twelve depth charges that broke the U-boat into halves. The PB4Y1 crew dropped three life rafts to the 25−30 men seen in the water. On 3 December, the cruiser USS Marblehead rescued the only survivor, who died in hospital. The type IXD2, U-849, U-cruiser sailed from Kiel on 2 October 1943 and on 25 November another PB4Y1 from VB 107 found the U-boat on the surface. The pilot dropped six depth charges at 25 ft (7.6 m), sinking the U-boat and damaging the PB4Y1, when one bounced off the U-boat and damaged the elevator and rudder of the bomber, that managed to return to Ascension, the crew reporting around thirty survivors in the water but none were found.

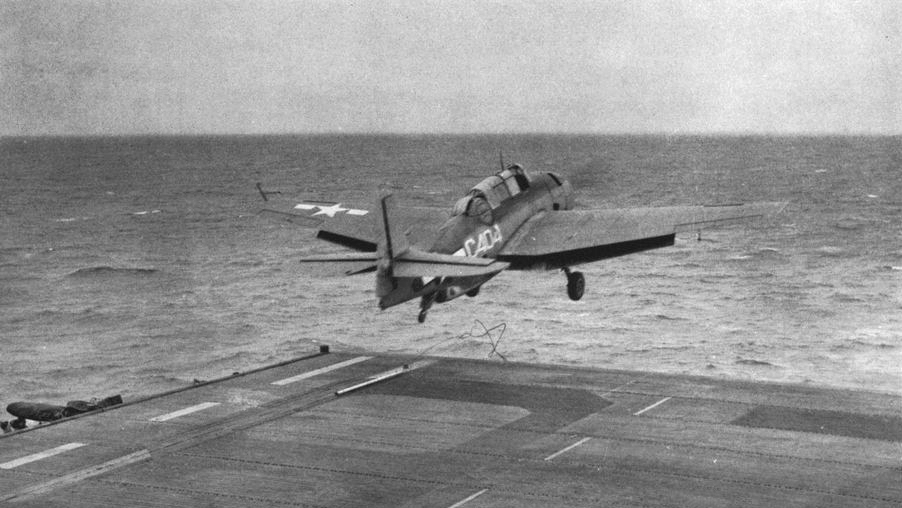
A Grumman TBF Avenger taking off

The Type XB minelayer U-219 operating as a tanker, sailed from Norway on 22 October 1943 to fuel U-488, then refuelled U-510 on 30 November and U-172 on 10 December. Ultra decrypts revealed the rendezvous to the Allies and Bogue was diverted from a convoy but failed to find the U-boats. Just after dawn on 12 December, an Avenger found U-172 that dived and the Avenger pilot dropped a Fido to no effect. The captain of Bogue ordered a hunt to exhaustion and the aircraft carrier and its screen of three destroyers attacked by bomb, depth-charge, Hedgehog spigot mortar and Fido. At 10:00 a.m. on 13 December, U-172 surfaced, engaged the US destroyers and was sunk; 46 of the crew being taken prisoner.

U-510 sailed on 3 November 1943 for Penang and refuelled on 30 November from U-219. East of the Cape of Good Hope, the U-boat attacked a merchant ship off Durban on 13 January 1944 but missed. On 28 January U-510 met the tanker MV Charlotte Schliemann (7,747 GRT) 300 nmi (560 km; 350 mi) south of Mauritius to fuel. U-510 patrolled the north end of the Arabian Sea between Oman and the Indian coast. On 23 February, Convoy PA 69 travelling between the Persian Gulf and Aden was attacked and the captain, Alfred Eick, claimed the US freighter E.G. Seubert (9,181 GRT) sunk on 23 February at 13°50′N, 48°49′E with six crew killed, the 7,385 GRT British tanker San Alvaro, that was scuttled at 13°46′N, 48°55′E with one man killed, the 7,229 GRT Norwegian Tarifa on 7 March, sunk at 12°48′N, 58°44′E with six men killed. On 19 March, the US SS John A. Poor (7,176 GRT) was sunk at 13°58'N, 70°30'E with 34 men killed and the Norwegian Erling Brøvig (9,970 GRT) was damaged off Majhada on 22 March and on 27 March, the British minesweeping trawler HMS Maaløy was sunk, with 26 members of the crew killed, U-510 reaching Penang on 5 May 1944.

The Type IXD2 U-cruiser U-850 sailed from Kiel for Penang on 18 November 1943. On 20 December 580 nmi (1,070 km; 670 mi) south of the Azores, an Avenger from Bogue, that was escorting Convoy GUS 23. The Avenger dropped depth charges but they hung up at the first attempt and fell short on the second attempt. Two Wildcats and two more Avengers arrived and forced U-850 to dive, at which, the Avengers dropped Fidos, sinking the U-boat at 32°54′N, 37°01′W. The destroyers USS Badger and USS Du Pont found no survivors.

== 1944 ==
Ascension Island (circled in red)

The prospect for submarine blockade-runners had worsened, after the meagre results of the 1943 operations. Japanese scientists might have gained something from the cargo carried by U-boats from Europe but the three boats that returned from the Far East had carried a miserable amount of raw materials for the German war economy. bigger U-cruisers were under construction but this would take time and even then the quantities obtained from surface ships like Pietro Orsolo that delivered 5,100 long tons (5,200 t) of rubber were far larger than what could be expected from submarine transport. From 1 January to 1 June 1944, BdU sent sixteen U-boats to the Far East and eight boats made the return journey. The outbound boats carried supplies for the base at Penang and the returning boats carried rubber, tin, tungsten, quinine and opium to France. Some of the boats combined offensive patrols with the voyage. Eleven of the U-boats were sunk and five returned to base. The tanker Charlotte Schliemann was sent to the Indian Ocean but the British and US code-breakers discovered this through Enigma decrypts.

U-177, en route from La Pallice to the Far East, under the command of a new captain, Heinz Bucholtz, suffered morale problems, as the new captain incessantly drilled the crew and inflicted punishments for every mistake. The effect of this punitive regime was to turn a tight ship into a slack one. On 6 February 1944, at 10°35′S, 23°15′W, 540 nmi (1,000 km; 620 mi) west-south-west of Ascension Island in the South Atlantic, B3. a USN PB4Y-1 Liberator. from Bombing Squadron 107 (VB-107) was on a patrol to investigate a possible U-boat at 10°S, 24°W. With good visibility and cumulus cloud rising from 2,000 ft (610 m) the crew spotted a U-boat heading south at about 10 kn (19 km/h; 12 mph) and managed to approach to within a mile, before being spotted. The bomber dropped six depth charges from 100 ft (30 m) ahead of the conning tower in which no-one could be seen. The U-boat sank but the conning tower was visible beneath the water, apparently turning to starboard and the pilot dropped the last three depth charges ahead of where the conning tower was thought to be. Survivors were seen in the water and life rafts were dropped by another PB4Y-1. One survivor reported that about twenty of the crew of 65 men got out of the boat but Bucholz and five men were killed in the later bombing and strafing; fourteen men were rescued by USS Omaha. (Note: Kemp (1999) has fifty men killed and ten taken prisoner. Niestlé has 15 survivors.)

=== January outbound ===
U-1062 sailed from Bergen on 3 January 1944 with a cargo of 35 torpedoes and five tubes loaded. The lack of torpedoes for gruppe Monsun at Penang was so bad that three of the Type IXC40 boats had been ordered to load up with cargo and return to Europe, after patrolling in the Indian Ocean. U-1062 was fuelled by U-188 on 22 March, after the sinking of Charlotte Schliemann and Brake, handing over new Enigma keys. On 8 April U-1062 rendezvoused with U-532 that was turning back to Penang, took on fuel and both arrived on 19 April.

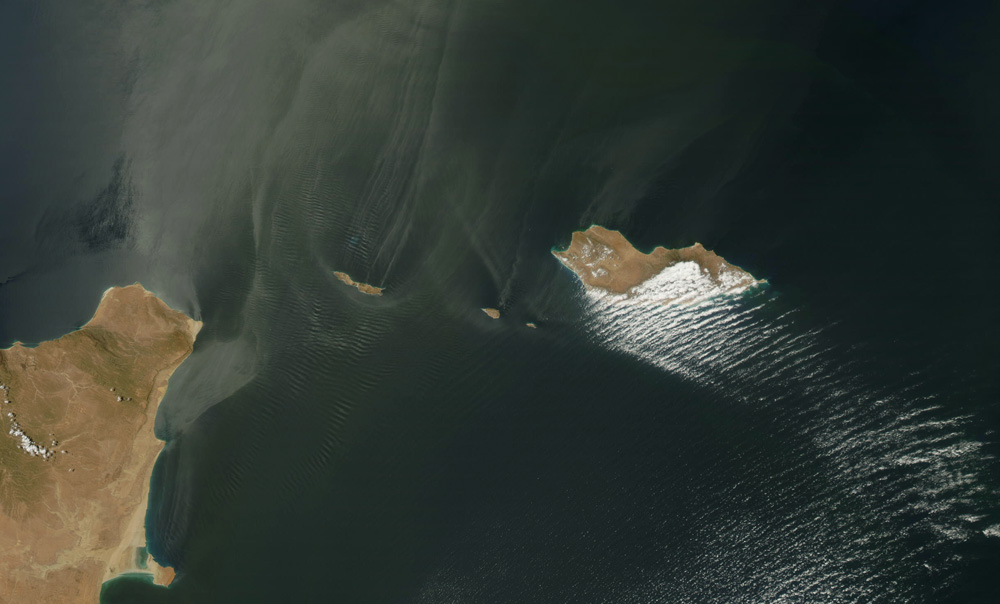
Cape Gardafui with the islands of the Socotra Archipelago to the east

U-852 sailed from Kiel on 18 January 1944 and sank the 4,700 GRT Greek freighter Peleus on 13 March and the British freighter Dahomian (5,300 GRT) on 1 April. The British tracked the U-boat around the Cape of Good Hope by direction finding and a search by RAF Wellingtons of 8 Squadron and 621 Squadron from British Forces Aden began on 1 May. Wellington E of 621 Squadron found the U-boat off Ras Hafun in the Arabian Sea on the same day, attacked and damaged the air induction valve, making it impossible for the U-boat to submerge. Both squadrons attacked the U-boat from 2 to 3 May when Wellington G of 8 Squadron severely damaged the U-boat. With five gunners killed and one dying, U-852 was beached on the east coast of Somaliland (now Somalia) at 09°32′N, 50°45′E, near Cape Guardafui and the bows and stern were blown off by demolition charges; the 59 survivors were later to taken prisoner. (Note: After the war, several officers were tried for war crimes, over a massacre of survivors from Peleus; the captain and two officers were convicted and shot on 30 November 1945.)

UIT-22, the requisitioned ex-Regia Marina submarine Alpino Bagnolini, sailed on 26 January 1944 from Bordeaux with cargo for gruppe Monsun. Unknown to the crew, the Allied code breakers tracked the submarine as it headed south and a PB4Y-1 from the USN VB-107 from Ascension Island made three bombing runs dropping two depth charges each on three bombing runs. One man was killed, a periscope smashed, a fuel tank ruptured with the loss of 32 long tons (33 t) of fuel but had enough left to reach Penang. The boat was to rendezvous with U-178 to hand over a Naxos apparatus but the British planned an ambush using the information from their Enigma decrypts. The boat was attacked at 41°28′S, 17°40′E, 450 nmi (830 km; 520 mi) south of Cape Town by 262 Squadron Catalinas on 11 March. Remaining on the surface to fight it out, Catalina P was damaged but the submarine suffered worse damage by depth charges and Catalinas D and A strafed and dropped depth charges each time the submarine surfaced all 43 members of the crew were killed. When U-178 arrived to rendezvous, all that could be seen was an oil slick.

=== February outbound ===
Map of the Cape Verde islands (circled in green)

U-1059 a new Type VIIF U-boat sailed from Bergen on 12 February 1944 with a cargo of 35 torpedoes and five loaded into its torpedo tubes for gruppe Monsun. The boat was scheduled to meet U-488 a Type XIV Milchkuh (milk cow) west of the Cape Verde islands, to fuel on its journey to Penang. U-488 sailed on 22 February from Brest and US code-breakers uncovered the planned rendezvous. The aircraft carrier USS Block Island and its destroyers were in the eastern Atlantic and headed westwards at high speed to ambush the U-boats at their rendezvous and on 16 March happened on U-801 at 16°42′N, 30°28′W.

A Wildcat–Avenger combination of Composite Squadron VC-6 spotted the U-boat at 13°10′N, 33°44′W, south-west of the Cape Verdes and attacked; the U-boat escaped temporarily, before being hunted and destroyed. On 19 March another Wildcat–Avenger pair from VC-6 caught U-1059 stopped on the surface with about 18 crewmen taking a swim around it. The Avenger sank the U-boat with two depth charges, was hit by return-fire and ditched with only one of the three crew surviving; 47 men from the U-boat were killed and eight were rescued, all wounded and under shark attack, by the destroyer USS Corry of the Block Island group.

U-843, a Type IXC/40 U-boat, sailed from Lorient on 19 February, due to fuel later from U-488. On 6 and 12 March U-843 stopped and searched a Portuguese and a Spanish ship. On 24 March U-843 rendezvoused with U-488 to the west of the Cape Verdes to fuel, then on 4 April met U-178, to pass over new Enigma keys. A B-24 from Patrol Squadron VB-107 appeared and strafed U-178 but did not bomb. Four days later, U-843 sank the British ship Nebraska (8,300 GRT) and on 10 April, another B-24 from VB-107 attacked the boat and damaged the two stern torpedo tubes. BdU cancelled operations off Cape Town and the boat fuelled from a Japanese submarine in the Indian Ocean before reaching Jakarta on 11 June after 114 days.

U-851 sailed from Kiel on 26 February 1944 with a cargo of 1,878 mercury and 500 U-boat batteries. The boat was to operate off the US coast and then proceed to the Indian Ocean. The captain made a weather report on 27 March when 380 nmi (700 km; 440 mi) south-east of St John's, Newfoundland at the request of BdU. The boat disappeared without trace in March–April 1944; BdU assumed that the boat had reached the Indian Ocean but lost hope of the survival of it and the 70 crew on 30 June after 126 days.

U-801 sailed on 26 February 1944; while hunting for U-488 and U-1059 the US Bogue-class escort carrier Block Island happened upon U-801 on 16 March, 300 nmi (560 km; 350 mi) west of the Cape Verdes. A Wildcat–Avenger pair from VC-6 attacked the boat, strafing killed one man and woulded nine before the boat submerged. When U-801 surfaced that night to bury the dead man, the captain signalled BdU that arranged a meeting on 20 March with U-488, a Type XIV Milchkuh (supply submarine) that had a doctor. The signal was detected by the Bogue group and Avengers carrying magnetic anomaly detectors (MAD) tracked U-801. At 1:41 a.m. an Avenger crew found the boat on the surface heading west at 18 kn (33 km/h; 21 mph) after submerging for an hour the boat was brought to the surface and an Avenger dropped a Fido, the U-boat trailing an oil slick, visible in daylight. Avengers dropped sonobuoys and depth charges, sending the submarine to 984 ft (300 m). The destroyers USS Corry and USS Bronstein conducted eight depth charge and Hedgehog salvoes at 16°42′N, 30°28′W, forcing U-801 to the surface, where it was engaged by gunfire and sank at 11:24 a.m. Ten men of the crew were killed and 47 rescued.

=== March outbound ===
The Type IXD2 U-boat U-181 sailed from La Pallice on 16 March and arrived in the south Atlantic. On 1 May sank the 5,300 GRT British merchant ship Janeta. In the Indian Ocean, U-181 sank the Dutch freighter Garoet (7,100 GRT) on 19 June, the 7,100 GRT British freighter Tanda on 15 July and on 19 July the British King Frederick (5,300 GRT) and was narrowly missed by the US submarine Stratagem on 7 August before reaching Penang on 8 August after 146 days. U-196 also sailed from La Pallice on 16 March 1944 and sank the British freighter Shahzada (5,500 GRT) in the Arabian Sea before reaching Penang on 10 August after a voyage of 149 days.

U-537, a Type IXC40, sailed on 25 March from Lorient, fuelled from U-488 on 17 April and entered the Indian Ocean and the captain claimed the sinking of a destroyer on 8 July off Ceylon but this was not confirmed. Because of the mining off Penang by submarines and aircraft, BdU had established a new base in Java at Batavia and U-537 arrived on 2 August, after a 131-day voyage. The last departure of the month was a Type IXC40 U-1224 (Marco Polo II) a present from Hitler to Emperor Hirohito that sailed from Kiel as RO-501 with a Japanese crew. Tipped off by the Allied code-breakers Bogue with five new destroyer escorts searched for the U-boat to the north-west of the Cape Verdes. As night fell on 13 May, USS Francis M. Robinson obtained an Asdic contact at 18°08′N, 33°13′W and attacked with depth charges and Hedgehogs; the U-boat disappeared without trace.

=== April outbound ===
U-859 sailed on 4 April, the first departure of the month, with a schnorkel and cargo of mercury. On 26 April, in the north Atlantic, U-859 found several ships that had straggled from Convoy SC 157 and sank the 6,300 GRT Panamanian ship Colin. After reporting the success to BdU the U-boat managed to evade the many anti-submarine ships in the region. U-859 entered the Indian Ocean towards the end of June and in July it was strafed and depth charged by a British Catalina, causing much damage. Despite an extensive search, the local anti-submarine forces failed to destroy the U-boat and the crew managed to make repairs and enter the Gulf of Aden. On 28 August the boat sank the 7,200 GRT US freighter John Barry and on 1 September, the 7,400 GRT British merchant ship Troilus. On 23 September, in the Straits of Malacca, at 05°46′N, 100°04′E, being escorted into Penang by Japanese ships, the U-859 was torpedoed by HMS Trenchant that fired three torpedoes from its stern tubes, one torpedo hitting amidships. Ten men were rescued by the submarine and another eight survivors were later rescued by a Japanese submarine, 47 men being killed.

U-860, a new Type IXD2, sailed from Kiel on 11 April 1944 and on 9 June the captain signalled to BdU his position and that two men had been lost overboard in a storm. The signal was traced by Allied Huff Duff and conformed to Enigma information already collected. The escort carrier USS Solomons, of TG.41.6 with the destroyer escorts USS Gustafson, USS Herzog, USS Straub and USS Trumpeter, recently arrived in the south Atlantic, began a search and when south of St Helena during the morning of 15 June, an Avenger of composite Squadron VC-9 found the U-boat at 10:21 a.m. The Avenger attacked three times, against return fire from the U-boat, was shot down on the fourth pass and lost with all hands. Near nightfall, at 5:22 p.m. another Avenger found the submarine at 25°27′S, 05°30′W and brought another Avenger and several Wildcats from Solomons that attacked the U-boat with gunfire, rockets and depth charges, inflicting damage and causing an oil leak. An Avenger depth charged from too low an altitude, was caught in the explosion, crashed into the sea and the crew was killed but U-860 was severely damaged and sank with 42 members of the crew. Later, the destroyer escorts Herzog and Straub rescued 21 survivors and buried one man at sea.

- U-198 sailed 20 April 1944 and sank the 3,300 GRT South African Columbine, the 5,100 GRT British Director, the 7,300 GRT British Empire City and the 7,200 GRT British Empire Day before being sunk in the Indian Ocean on 12 August 1944 by a Royal Navy anti-submarine group with HMS Shah and HMS Begum.
- U-861 sailed on 20 April 1944 and sank the 1,700 GRT Brazilian troopship Vital de Oliveira, the 7,200 GRT US ship William Gaston, the 7,500 GRT British Berwickshire and the 5,700 GRT Greek ship Ioannis Fafalios before reaching Penang on 22 September.

=== May outbound ===
- U-490 sailed as an oiler on 6 May 1944 with supplies, spare parts and electronics; she was sunk by aircraft from USS Croatan on 12 June 1944.

=== June outbound ===
- U-862 sailed on 3 June 1944 and sank five ships before reaching Penang on 9 September.

=== July outbound ===
U-863 was damaged by a Mosquito of 333 Squadron on 20 July and returned to Trondheim for repairs. The boat sailed again on 26 July and was sunk with all 67 hands, 600 nmi (1,100 km; 690 mi) east-south-east of Pernambuco at 10°45′S, 25°30′W, by two USN PB4Y1s of VB-107 on 29 September.

=== August outbound ===
- U-180 sailed as an oiler on 20 August 1944 and was sunk by mines leaving port.
- U-195 sailed as an oiler on 20 August 1944 and reached Jakarta on 28 December.
- U-219 sailed with cargo on 23 August 1944 and reached Jakarta on 11 December.
- U-871 sailed on 31 August 1944 and was sunk by a RAF B-17 on 26 September 1944.

=== February 1945 outbound ===
- U-864 sailed on 5 February 1945, with a cargo of mercury and plans and parts for Me 163 and Me 262 fighters, then was torpedoed by HMS Venturer on 9 February.

=== April 1945 outbound ===
- U-234 sailed on 1 April 1945 with cargo, carrying 74 long tons (75 t) of lead, 26 long tons (26 t) of mercury, 12 long tons (12 t) of steel, seven tons of optical glass, 43 long tons (44 t) of aircraft plans and parts, 560 kg (1,230 lb) of uranium oxide and a dismantled Me 262, then surrendered at Portsmouth Naval Shipyard when the war ended.

== Submarine patrols from Penang ==
=== Tactical developments ===
On 27 November 1943, U-178 sailed as the Penang base lacked the facilities to refit a Type IXD2 U-cruiser. The boat was to complete a patrol in the Indian Ocean and then head for France with a cargo of 121 long tons (123 t) of tin, 30 long tons (30 t) of rubber and 2 long tons (2.0 t) of tungsten. She sank the US 7,200 GRT Jose Navarro before reaching France on 25 May. From 1 January to 1 June 1944, BdU sent 16 U-boats from France to Penang and eight U-boats back from Penang with commodities that were scarce in Europe like rubber, tin, tungsten, quinine and opium. Some of the boats sailed direct and others patrolled along the route. Several tankers, including Charlotte Schliemann, were ordered to a quiet part of the Indian Ocean to fuel the boats and Charlotte Schliemann replenished U-178 and U-510 on 27 January. The British code-breakers at Bletchley Park were eavesdropping on German naval wireless communications and the Admiralty sent the cruiser HMS Newcastle, the destroyer HMS Relentless and seven Catalinas from Mauritius to follow Huff-Duff bearing and sink the tanker. One of the Catalinas spotted the tanker and guided Relentless to intercept on the night of 11/12 February.Relentless opened fire on the ship at which, the Germans scuttled and abandoned ship at 23°23′S, 74°37′E, the crew being embarked by U-532, that was fuelled on 27 February by U-178.

=== January 1944 return ===
U-532 sailed on 4 January 1944 to make an offensive patrol off the Indian coast and sank the 7,200 GRT American Liberty ship SS Walter Camp and the British SS Triona (7,300 GRT) but needed to fuel from Charlotte Schliemann. At the rendezvous on 12 February, nothing was found, except for two Catalinas and on 16 February the captain reported to BdU that the meeting had been uncovered. BdU sent the U-boat to another rendezvous for 19 February and sent U-178, also on the way back to France, to fuel U-532 and then resume the journey home. On 22 February the captain of U-532 reported that Charlotte Schliemann must have been sunk and ordered the tanker Brake, the last German ship in the Indian Ocean, to take over around 11 March for U-532, that had received some fuel from U-178 but not enough to reach France. The type IXC40 boats U-168, U-183, and U-188 also on the way home were to be fuelled as well.

U-168 had sailed on 28 January 1944 with 100 long tons (100 t) cargo but had to turn back when a crewman fell ill. The U-boat sailed again on 7 February, to patrol off India and then return to France. On 14 February, 270 nmi (500 km; 310 mi) south-west of Colombo, U-168 sank the 1,400 GRT British salvage vessel Salviking, 27 of the 55 crew being killed. On 15 February the 4,400 GRT Greek freighter SS Epaminondas C. Embiricos was sunk. On 21 February, the Norwegian tanker MV Fenris (9,804 GRT) was damaged and at the rendezvous with Brake found that the captain was so nervous about being found that he stopped fuelling U-168 and nominated another rendezvous. The British escort carrier HMS Battler, the cruiser HMS Suffolk and the destroyers HMS Quadrant and Roebuck were sent to attack the ship and any U-boats at the rendezvous. After an aircraft found the ship, the crew scuttled it and U-168 dived, later to embark the 135 crew, making 190 men aboard and returned to Jakarta with U-532.

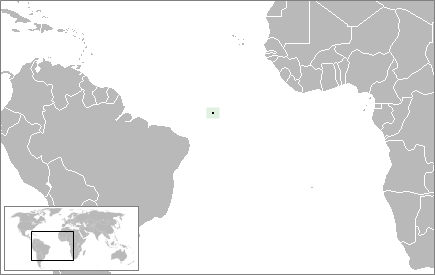
Map showing the St Paul Rocks

After the loss of Charlotte Schliemann and Brake, BdU became convinced that the U-boat wireless codes had been read and on 13 March the wireless settings were cancelled and orders sent that a new key, based on the names and addresses of the wireless maintenance man and the third watch officer, were temporarily to be used and announced that a big change in cypher settings was shortly to be implemented. When the Allied code breakers at Bletchley Park and the US Navy OP-20-G discovered this, they berated the Admiralty for its recklessness and on 16 March the Admiralty signalled that U-boat fuelling rendezvouses were to be left alone.

U-188 sailed on 9 January 1944 with cargo and on 20 January sank the British ship SS Fort Buckingham (7,122 GRT) followed by the British 7,130 GRT SS Fort la Maune on 25 January and the next day the British ships SS Samouri (7,219 GRT) and SS Surada (5,427 GRT). On 29 January the Greek 4,677 GRT SS Olga E Embirico was sunk, on 3 February the U-boat sank the Chinese SS Chung Cheng (7,176 GRT) and the Norwegian SS Viva (3,798 GRT) on 9 February. Near Cape Town on 22 March U-188 met U-1062 that was outbound for Penang and received the new Enigma cypher keys. On 22 April in the South Atlantic, near the St Paul Rocks, there was another meeting, this time with U-181 to take on board lubricating oil and an ill crew member. On 26 April, another 300 nmi (560 km; 350 mi) further north, the U-boat took on a Naxos radar detector from U-129 another outbound U-boat. U-188 was then ordered to rush to the assistance of U-66 near the Cape Verde islands; U-188 arrived on 2 May, passing over food and fuel but was attacked by a carrier-borne aircraft. The wireless failed, making it impossible to communicate with BdU of the rendezvous or of the presence of an aircraft carrier. U-188 reached Bordeaux on 19 June, somewhat to the surprise of BdU, that had assumed from the wireless silence that the submarine had been sunk.

=== February 1944 return ===
The sinking of Brake caused problems for U-183 that had sailed on 10 February 1944 with cargo but turned out to have decrepit batteries. The captain of U-183 wanted to get replacements from Brake or repairs but had to return to Penang. Comandante Cappellini, taken into German service as UIT-24 with the usual cargo, sailed on 9 February 1944 and also turned back to Penang after the loss of Brake. At Penang, the captain of U-183 found that 70 per cent of the batteries were useless and BdU sent him on a short patrol to Ceylon and the Maldives and then to Japan in hope of a remedy for the batteries. U-183 departed again on 17 May and on 5 June, sank the British 5,300 GRT ship SS Helen Moller, then met U-843, en route from France to Penang, for Enigma keys and Naxos apparatus, one set of the Enigma keys to be handed on to the Type VIIF torpedo carrying submarine U-1062, heading for France. Machinery trouble forced another return to Penang, where U-1062 arrived on 2 July and U-183 on 7 July.

Reginaldo Giuliani, in German service as UIT-23, sailed for France with cargo and three days later, in the Action of 14 February 1944, was torpedoed by HMS Tally-Ho in the Malacca Strait at 04°25′N, 100°09′E with the loss of 44 men, fifteen being rescued by the Japanese. The new I-52 sailed from Singapore for Lorient on 23 April in Unternehmen Tanne-Föhre (Operation Fir-Tree). The boat carried cargo, including 2 long tons (2.0 t) of gold and 14 passengers. Allied code-breakers followed its progress and its meeting on 23 June with U-530, 850 nmi (1,570 km; 980 mi) west of the Cape Verde islands, when it received a Naxos, its operator and a navigator. Allied anti-submarine units had received automatic sonobuoys to be dropped into the sea, that transmitted Asdic echoes to the aircraft overhead. Bogue tracked the submarines with Huff-Duff and during the evening, two Avengers from Bogue detected I-52 on radar, dropped the new sonobuoys and when propeller noises were heard, dropped two depth charges and a Fido. Next day 115 bales of rubber were recovered.

=== July−September 1944 return ===
U-1062 sailed for France with cargo on 6 July 1944 and was attacked on 16 July by HMS Templar but escaped. U-1062 was ordered to meet U-219 to fuel it for its journey to Japan. The wireless signals to arrange this were intercepted by Allied code-breakers and the Tenth Fleet sent Task Group.22.1, comprising USS Mission Bay and its four destroyers, later operating with TG.41.7, USS Tripoli also with four destroyers. From 28 September U-219 was hunted and it shot down an Avenger from USS Tripoli. On 30 September, aircraft from Mission Bay made several abortive attacks three destroyers were sent to 11°37′N, 34°43′W, the area of the last air attack. On 5 October, USS Fessenden obtained a good Asdic contact, made a Hedgehog attack and sank U-1062 with all hands.

=== October 1944 return ===
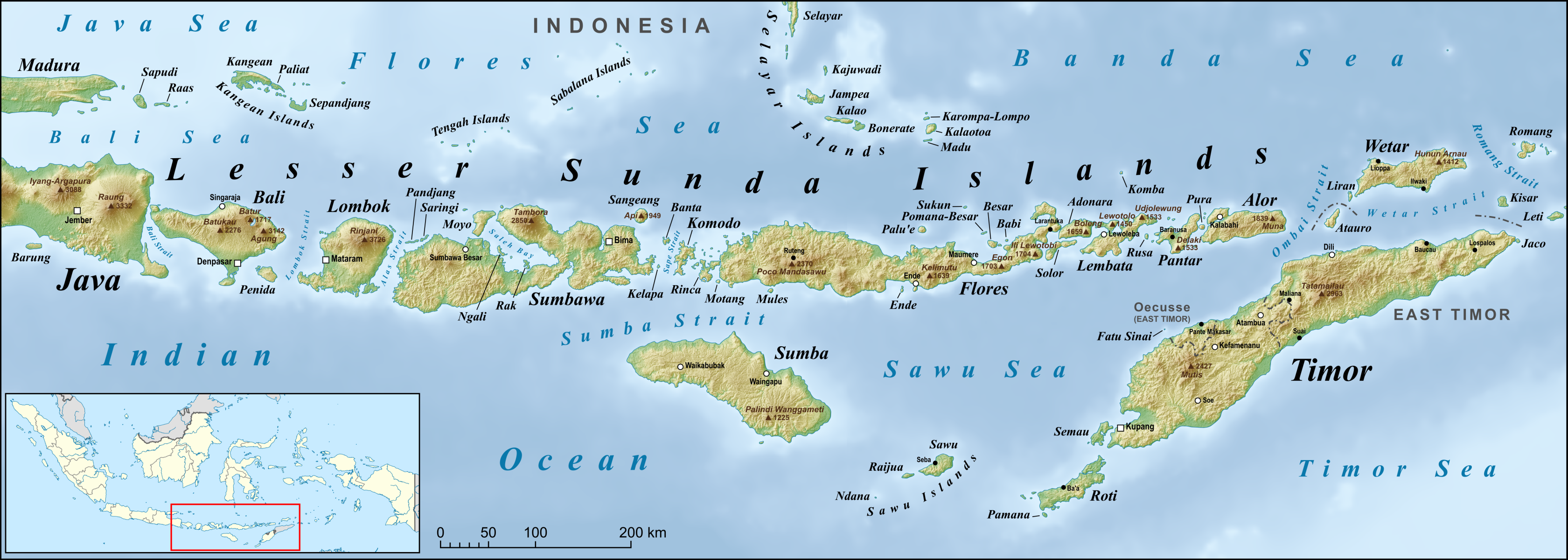
Map of the Lesser Sunda Islands

The Strait of Malacca, between Malaya and Sumatra and the Indian Ocean, had become as dangerous for Axis submarines as the Atlantic Ocean. Penang had an unhealthy climate, lacked food that was familiar to Europeans and was short of skilled labour, spare parts, ammunition and torpedoes, leading to routine refits taking two months; it had never worked well as a U-boat base. The Japanese hosts were aloof and as the war situation deteriorated, became hostile. With the loss of Charlotte Schliemann and Brake, U-boat supply ships had been swept from the Indian Ocean.

BdU ordered Dommes to abandon Penang for Batavia (Djakarta) nearer to the Indonesian oil industry and with access to the Indian Ocean via the Sunda Strait. Dommes was quickly to get the Monsun U-boats ready, load as much cargo and torpedoes as possible to return to Europe. The boats were to make for Norway, via the Denmark Strait or the Iceland–Faeroes Gap. None of the boats carried schnorkel apparatus and would need to surface to recharge batteries, traversing the most dangerous areas in the storms of a north Atlantic winter.

Map of the Sunda Strait

U-168 sailed from Batavia on 4 October, to rendezvous at Surabaya with U-537 and U-862 for patrols off Australia. U-168 was spotted by HNLMS Zwaardvisch off the northern coast of Java. The Dutch submarine fired a spread of six torpedoes at five-second intervals from 900 yd (820 m). The first torpedo missed ahead of the bows of the U-boat, the second hit the bow the third hit the control room, the fourth the engine room but did not explode; U-168 sank bows first at 06°20′S, 111°28′E. (Note: The survivors managed to escape from a depth of 120 ft (37 m) without breathing apparatus.Zwaardvisch rescued 27 men, taking four officers and a wounded man prisoner, the remainder of the survivors being put aboard a fishing boat and reaching Java. The survivors gave the useful information that Japanese anti-submarine reconnaissance flights began at 11:00 a.m.)

The German command in the Far East believed that slack security gave away the U-boat, some of the crew having brought their Indonesian girlfriends to the U-boat for a farewell party. (Note: Sharpe (1998) has 22 survivors and 23 killed.) U-181 sailed on 19 October 1944 and on 2 November, sank the 10,198 GRT US ship Fort Lee, then returned to Batavia on 5 January 1945 with a damaged propeller shaft. The boat was handed over to the Imperial Japanese Navy in May and commissioned as I-501.

=== November 1944 return ===
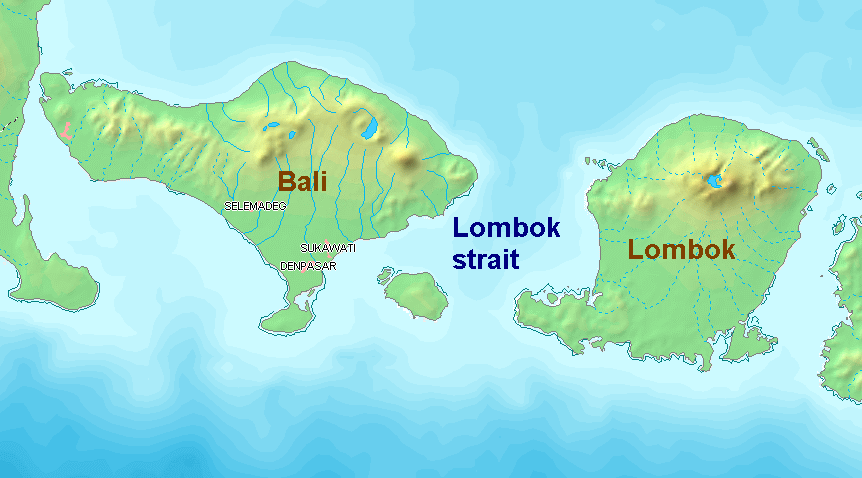
Map of the Lombok Strait

U-537 sailed from Batavia on 8 November 1944, heading eastwards to pass through the Lesser Sunda Islands, to patrol of south-western Australia. On 9 November the U-boat was near Bali. USS Flounder had sailed north through the Lombok Strait, was east of Surabaya at 07°13′S, 115°17′E and dived when what was taken to be the sail of a local boat was seen. The captain then realised that the vessel was a U-boat and fired four torpedoes at 8:00 a.m., two of the torpedoes being seen to hit the U-boat that exploded, with no survivors from the 58 crew. U-196 sailed from Batavia on 11 November 1944 through the Sunda Strait and disappeared at 06°20′S, 105°20′E, with all 65 crew. It was discovered later that the submarine HMS Porpoise had mined the area of the Sunda Strait south of Java. (Note: Kemp (1999) wrote that an accident when testing a locally-improvised schnorkel might have been the cause.)

U-862 sailed on 18 November 1944 and from December 1944 to January 1945 patrolled off Adelaide, Australia, evading a huge air and sea search. While preparing to attack the Greek Ilissos, an aircraft appeared, forcing the abandonment of the attack. The Australian corvettes HMAS Burnie, Lismore and Maryborough searched during 10 December but found nothing. On 24 December, U-862 sank The US 7,180 GRT freighter Robert J Walker off Sydney with 2 crew killed and 67 survivors; U-862 returned to Batavia on 15 February 1945. (Note: A search by eleven ships failed to find the U-boat but managed to rescue the survivors and Royal Australian Air Force (RAAF) B-24 bombers to the south-west of Fremantle, following D/F bearings, abortively searched for the U-boat from 29 to 31 January 1945. On the night of 5/6 February the US Peter Sylvester (7,167 GRT) was sunk 820 nmi (1,520 km; 940 mi) west of Fremantle. The attack was not discovered until a freighter happened upon survivors. Other lifeboats were found by a US and an Royal Australian Navy (RAN) ship. A search from 11 to 20 February, by aircraft from two British escort carriers, a US frigate and two RAN corvettes, for the last two lifeboats failed but one was found by chance on 28 February. On 10 March, the US submarine USS Rock found the last boat; 33 men had been killed in the sinking and there were 137 survivors.) U-843 sailed from Batavia for Norway on 10 December 1944 and fuelled on 28 December from U-195 that was en route for the Far East. On 9 April 1945, U-843 was at 57°48′N, 11°26′E, 30 nmi (56 km; 35 mi) east of the Kattegat between Denmark and Sweden, in the Little Belt. The U-boat was attacked by Mosquito A from 235 Squadron, near where U-804 and U-1065 were being attacked by the Banff Wing. U-843 was strafed and left smoking, stopped on the surface, with the loss of 44 men.

=== January–April 1945 return ===
U-510 sailed with cargo for Norway on 6 January 1945 and fuelled from U-195 in the Indian Ocean. On 23 February the U-boat went round the Cape of Good Hope, sank the 7,136 GRT Canadian freighter SS Point Pleasant Park that had been sailing independently off South West Africa; short of fuel, U-510 docked at St Nazaire to obtain a schnorkel and was still there when Germany surrendered. U-532 sailed for Norway on 13 January 1945 with a cargo of 8 long tons (8.1 t) rubber, tin, tungsten, molybdenum, selenium, quinine and crystals. In the Atlantic, the boat sank the 3,656 GRT British freighter Baron Jedburgh on 10 March and on 28 March, sank the 9,300 GRT US Tanker Oklahoma. The boat surrendered at Liverpool after the war ended and unloaded its cargo there.

U-861 sailed with cargo from Batavia on 14 January 1945 and arrived at Trondheim in Norway on 18 April and sailed to Lisahally in Derry on 29 May to be handed over to the Allies. U-195 sailed for Norway, as an oiler, on 17 January 1945, fuelled U-532 and returned to Batavia on 3 March with worn-out engines. U-183 sailed on 22 April 1945 with a big Rising Sun emblem to avoid attack by Japanese forces. Two days later, the U-boat was torpedoed by USS Besugo north-west of Surabaya at 04°57′S, 112°52′E in the Java Sea and lost with all 54 crew.

== Japanese service ==
Four U-boats and two ex-Italian submarines remaining in Japanese territory were taken over by the Imperial Japanese Navy when Germany surrendered. The Japanese commissioned the U-boats into service and U-195 a Type IXD1 oiler, became I-506 and was scrapped at Batavia (now Jakarta) after Japan surrendered. U-181, a Type IXD2 cruiser, became I-501, was captured at Singapore and sunk by the Royal Navy in the Strait of Malacca in 1946. U-862, a Type IXD2 cruiser, became I-502 and was also captured at Singapore and sunk by the Royal Navy in the Strait of Malacca in 1946. U-219, a Type XB minelayer, was renamed I-505 and after the Japanese surrender was captured at Surabaya and sunk by the Dutch Navy in the Sunda Strait in 1946. The German crews were interned by the Japanese, in what Clay Blair in 2000, called "fairly comfortable circumstances". The Italian submarines Comandante Cappellini (renamed Aquilla III) was named UIT-24 by the Germans, then I-503 by the Japanese and Luigi Torelli, renamed UIT-25 when taken over by the Germans, became I-504 in Japanese service. Both boats were found at Kobe when Japan surrendered and were scuttled by the US Navy in Kii Suido.

== Axis order of battle ==
See also Wolfpack Eisbär Order of battle

=== Late 1942 − early 1943 ===
Patrols to Penang
Name	Flag	Type	Sailed	Notes
I-30	Imperial Japanese Navy	Type B1	22 August 1942	Mined Singapore, 13 October 1942
U-178	Kriegsmarine	Type IXD2	28 March 1943	Penang, 27 August 1943
U-511	Kriegsmarine	Type IXC	10 May	Penang, 17 July
Comandante Cappellini	Kingdom of Italy	Marcello	11 May	Singapore, 13 July
Reginaldo Giuliani	Kingdom of Italy	Liuzzi	16 May	Singapore, 1 August
Enrico Tazzoli	Kingdom of Italy	Calvi	21 May	Sunk, Bay of Biscay
Barbarigo	Kingdom of Italy	Marcello	17 June	Sunk Bay of Biscay
Luigi Torelli	Kingdom of Italy	Marconi	18 June	Penang, 27 August

=== Late 1943 ===
Gruppe Monsun (1943)
Name	Flag	Type	Date	Notes
First Wave
U-200	Kriegsmarine	Type IXD2	11 June	Sunk 24 June
U-188	Kriegsmarine	Type IXC/40	30 June	Penang, 31 October
U-514	Kriegsmarine	Type IXC	3 July	Sunk, 8 July
U-509	Kriegsmarine	Type IXC	3 July	Sunk, 15 July
U-183	Kriegsmarine	Type IXC	3 July	Penang, 27 October
U-532	Kriegsmarine	Type IXC	3 July	Penang, 31 October
U-168	Kriegsmarine	Type IXC/40	3 July	Penang, 11 November
U-506	Kriegsmarine	Type IXC	6 July	Sunk, 1st Antisubmarine Squadron, Bay of Biscay, 12 July
U-533	Kriegsmarine	Type IXC/40	6 July	Sunk, 244 Squadron, Gulf of Oman, 16 October
U-516	Kriegsmarine	Type IXC	8 July	Fuelled gruppe Monsun, to France, 23 August
U-847	Kriegsmarine	Type IXD2	29 July	Ice damage Denmark Strait, fuelled U-boats, sunk, 27 August
U-462	Kriegsmarine	Type XIV	29 July	Tanker (Milchkuh) sunk, Bay of Biscay, 30 July
Second Wave
U-848	Kriegsmarine	Type IXD2	18 September	Sunk South Atlantic, 18 September
U-849	Kriegsmarine	Type IXD2	2 October	Sunk, South Atlantic, 25 November
U-219	Kriegsmarine	Type X	22 October	Diverted to fuel U-boats, returned France, 1 January 1944
U-510	Kriegsmarine	Type IXC	3 November	Penang, 5 May 1944
U-850	Kriegsmarine	Type IXD2	18 November	Sunk, 20 December

=== Later sailings ===
1943−1945
Name	Flag	Type	Date	Notes
1943
I-8	Imperial Japanese Navy	Junsen III	5 September	Singapore, 5 December
1944
U-177	Kriegsmarine	Type IXD2	2 January	Sunk, 540 nmi WSW Ascension, 6 February, 50† 10 surv.
U-1062	Kriegsmarine	Type VIIF	3 January	Penang, 13 April
U-852	Kriegsmarine	Type IXD2	18 January	Sunk, Arabian Sea, 3 April
UIT-22	Kriegsmarine	Liuzzi	26 January	Ex-Alpino Bagnolini, sunk, 11 March
U-1059	Kriegsmarine	Type VIIF	12 February	Sunk, 19 March
U-843	Kriegsmarine	Type IXC/40	18 February	11 June, Batavia (now Jakarta)
U-801	Kriegsmarine	Type IXC/40	26 February	Sunk, 16 March
U-851	Kriegsmarine	Type IXD2	26 February	Missing, March
U-181	Kriegsmarine	Type IXD2	16 March	Penang, 8 August
U-196	Kriegsmarine	Type IXD2	16 March	Penang, 10 August
U-537	Kriegsmarine	Type IXC/40	25 March	Batavia, 2 August
U-1224	Kriegsmarine	Type IXC/40	April	Sunk, Atlantic, 13 May
U-859	Kriegsmarine	Type IXD2	4 April	Sunk, Penang, 23 September
U-860	Kriegsmarine	Type IXD2	11 April	Sunk, South Atlantic, 15 June
U-198	Kriegsmarine	Type IXD2	20 April	Sunk, Indian Ocean, 12 August
U-861	Kriegsmarine	Type IXD2	20 April	Penang, 22 September
U-490	Kriegsmarine	Type XIV	6 May	Sunk, 12 June
U-862	Kriegsmarine	Type IXD2	3 June	Penang, 9 September
U-863	Kriegsmarine	Type IXD2	26 July	29 September
U-180	Kriegsmarine	Type IXD1	20 August	Sunk, mined leaving port
U-195	Kriegsmarine	Type IXD1	20 August	Batavia, 20 September
U-219	Kriegsmarine	Type X	23 August	Batavia, 11 December
1945
U-864	Kriegsmarine	Type IXD2	5 February	Sunk, 9 February
U-234	Kriegsmarine	Type X	1 April	Surrendered, Portsmouth Naval Yard

=== Gruppe Monsun sinkings ===
Ships sunk by Monsun boats (in transit and on patrol)
Date	Name	Flag	GRT	Boat	Notes
1943
1 June	Salabangka	Netherlands	6,586	U-178	Convoy CD 20, 0† 31°09′S, 29°13′E
27 June	SS Sebastian Cermeno	United States	7,194	U-511	5† 28°50′S, 50°20′E
4 July	Breiviken	Norway	2,669	U-178	Convoy DN 50 3† 33 surv. 21°50′S, 37°50′E
4 July	Michael Livanos	Greece	4,774	U-178	2† 39 surv. 22°52′S, 47°30′E
11 July	Mary Livanos	Greece	4,771	U-178	8† 39 surv. 15°40′S, 40°45′E
17 July	City of Canton	Merchant Navy	6,692	U-178	7† 1 pow, 84 surv, 13°52′S, 41°10′E
19 September	SS Fort Longueuil	Merchant Navy	7,128	U-532	57† 2 surv. 10°S, 68°E
21 September	Cornelia P. Spencer	United States	7,176	U-188	2† 68 surv. 02°08′N, 50°10′E
1 October	Tahsinia	Merchant Navy	7,267	U-532	0† 06°51′N, 73°487′E
2 October	Haiching	Merchant Navy	2,183	U-168	12† 58 surv, 18°46′N, 71°55′E
27 December	José Navarro	United States	7,244	U-178	0† 166 surv. 08°20′N, 73°55′E
1944
20 January	Fort Buckingham	Merchant Navy	7,122	U-188	42† 46 surv. 8°19′N, 66°40′E
25 January	SS Fort la Maune	Merchant Navy	7,130	U-188	0† 13°4′N, 56°30′E
26 January	SS Samouri	Merchant Navy	7,219	U-188	0† 13°13′N, 55°56′E
26 January	Surada	Merchant Navy	5,427	U-188	0† 103 surv. 13°00′N, 55°15′E
29 January	Olga E. Embincos	Greece	4,677	U-188	20† 21 surv. 12°30′N, 50°10′E
4 February	Chung Cheng	Republic of China	7,176	U-188	20† 52 surv. 13°54′N, 54°30′E
9 February	Viva	Norway	3,798	U-188	0† 37 surv. 12°30′N, 57°50′E
29 February	MV Palma	Merchant Navy	5,419	U-183	7† 50 surv. 5°51′N, 79°38′E
13 March	Peleus	Greece	8,833	U-852	38† 3 surv. 2°S, 10°W
27 March	Tulagi	Merchant Navy	2,281	U-532	47† 7 surv. 11° 00′S, 78°40′E
1 April	Dahomian	Merchant Navy	5,277	U-852	2† 49 surv. 34°25′S, 18°19′E
5 June	Helen Moller	Merchant Navy	5,259	U-183	4† 69 surv. 04°28′S, 74°45′E
25 July	Robin Goodfellow	United States	6,885	U-862	68† 0 surv. 20°03′S, 14°21′W
13 August	Radbury	Merchant Navy	3,614	U-862	23† 35 surv. 24°20′S, 41°45′E
16 August	Empire Lancer	Merchant Navy	7,037	U-862	42† 0 surv. 15°S, 44°E
18. August	Nairung	Merchant Navy	5,414	U-862	91† 0 surv. 15°S, 42°E
19 August	Wayfarer	Merchant Navy	5,068	U-862	51† 10 surv. 14°30′S, 42°20′E
24 December	Robert J. Walker	United States	7,180	U-862	2† 67 surv. 36°32′S, 150°45′E
1945
6 February	Peter Silvester	United States	7,176	U-862	33† 137 surv. 34°19′S, 159°32′E
10 March	SS Baron Jedburgh	Merchant Navy	3,656	U-532	1† 58 surv. 10°02′S, 25°00′W
28 March	Oklahoma	United States	9,298	U-532	Torpedoed, 13°52′N, 41°17′W, 40† 22 surv.

=== Monsun U-boat losses ===
Monsun boats lost in transit and on patrol
Date	Boat	Notes
24 June 1943	U-200	Sunk Catalina G, Patrol Squadron 84, 59°00′N, 26°18′W, 62† (Note: Kemp (1999) has B-24 H of 120 Squadron sinking the U-boat at 58°15′N, 25°25′W, south-west of Iceland, 15 men surviving the sinking and being left to their fate.)
12 July 1943	U-506	Sunk B-24, 1st Antisubmarine Squadron, 42°30′N, 16°30′W, 48† 6 pow (16 July)
15 July 1943	U-509	Wildcat and Avenger, Composite Squadron VC-29, Fido, 34°02′N, 26°01′W, 54†
16 October 1943	U-533	Two Bisley 244 Squadron, 25°28′S, 56°50′E, 52† 2 surv. 1 pow HMIS Hiravati
5 November 1943	U-848	Bombed PB4Y-1s Patrol Squadron 107, 2 B-25, 1st Composite Squadron, 10°09′S, 18°00′W, 62† 1 pow† (Note: Kemp (1999) has 63 killed and 1 man of 20 survivors rescued by USS Marblehead after a month adrift.)
25 November 1943	U-849	Bombed PB4Y-1 Bombing Squadron 107 06°30′S, 05°40′W, 63† (Note: Kemp (1999) has survivors and a life raft dropped but none ever found.)
3 May 1944	U-852	Wellingtons 8 Squadron, 621 Squadron 9°32′N, 50°59′E, 7† 59 pow (Note: Kemp (1999) has survivors making land and hunted by party from HMS Falmouth)
5 October 1944	U-168	Sunk, HNLMS Zwaardvisch 6°20′S, 111°28′E, 23† 22 surv. (Note: Kemp (1999) has 27 survivors, 5 pow, 22 put on a fishing boat, landed in Java.)
23 April 1945	U-183	Sunk USS Besugo 04°57′S, 112°52′E, 54†

== Bibliography ==
- Blair, Clay (1998). Hitler's U-Boat War: The Hunted 1942–1945. Vol. II. Random House. ISBN 0-679-45742-9.
- Blair, Clay (2000) [1999]. Hitler's U-Boat War: The Hunted 1942–1945. Vol. II (pbk. repr. Cassell & Co, London ed.). London: Weidenfeld & Nicolson. ISBN 978-0-30-435261-6.
- Boog, Horst; Krebs, Gerhard; Vogel, Detlef (2006). The Strategic Air War in Europe and the War in the West and East Asia 1943–1944/5. Germany and the Second World War. Vol. VII. Translated by Cook-Radmore, Derry; Garvie, Fransisca; Osers, Ewald; Smerin, Barry; Wilson, Barbara (Eng. trans. Clarendon Press, Oxford ed.). Potsdam: Militärgeschichtliches Forschungsamt (Research Institute for Military History). ISBN 978-0-19-822889-9.
  - Krebs, Gerhard. "Part III The War in the Pacific 1943–1945 I. Strategy and Policy after the Reversal of Fortunes early in 1943 3. Japanese–German Cooperation and the Problem of a Separate Peace with the USSR". In Boog, Krebs & Vogel (2006).
- Brice, Martin (1981). Axis Blockade Runners of World War II. London: B. T. Batsford. ISBN 0-7134-2686-1.
- Bruhn, David (2017). Ingram's Fourth Fleet: U.S. and Royal Navy Operations against German Runners, Raiders, and Submarines in the South Atlantic in World War II. Berwyn Heights, MD: Heritage Books. ISBN 978-0-78-845757-9.
- British Vessels lost at Sea 1939–45 (2nd facs. repr. Patrick Stephens, Cambridge ed.). London: HMSO. 1976 [1947]. ISBN 978-0-85-059267-2. original titles, Ships of the Royal Navy: Statement of Losses during the Second World War and British Merchant Vessels lost of Damaged by enemy Action during Second World War
- Jordan, Roger W. (2006) [1999]. The World's Merchant Fleets 1939: The Particulars and Wartime Fates of 6,000 Ships (2nd ed.). London: Chatham/Lionel Leventhal. ISBN 978-1-86176-293-1.
- Kemp, Paul (1999) [1997]. U-Boats Destroyed, German Submarine losses in the World Wars. London: Arms and Armour. ISBN 1-85409-515-3.
- Lenton, H. T. (1976). German Warships of Second World War. New York: Arco. ISBN 0-668-04037-8.
- Niestlé, Axel (1998). German U-Boat losses During World War II. London: Greenhill. ISBN 1-85367-352-8.
- Mitchell, William Harry; Sawyer, Leonard Arthur (1990). The Empire Ships (2nd ed.). London, New York, Hamburg, Hong Kong: Lloyd's of London Press Ltd. ISBN 1-85044-275-4.
- Paterson, Lawrence (2016) [2004]. Hitler's Grey Wolves: U-boats in the Indian Ocean. Barnsley: Frontline Books (Pen & Sword). ISBN 978-1-47388-273-7.
- Rohwer, Jürgen; Hümmelchen, Gerhard (2005) [1972]. Chronology of the War at Sea, 1939–1945: The Naval History of World War Two (3rd rev. ed.). London: Chatham. ISBN 1-86176-257-7.
- Roskill, S. W. (1962) [1957]. The War at Sea 1939–1945: The Period of Balance. History of the Second World War. Vol. II (3rd impr. ed.). London: HMSO. OCLC 174453986 – via Archive Foundation.
- Sharpe, Peter (1998). U-Boat Fact File: Detailed Service Histories of the Submarines Operated by the Kriegsmarine 1935–1945. Leicester: Midland Publishing. ISBN 978-1-85-780072-2.
- Taylor, J. C. (1966). German Warships of World War II. Garden City: Doubleday & Company. OCLC 1020215826.
- Turner, Leonard C. F.; Gordon-Cumming, H. R. (1961). Betzler, J. E. (ed.). War in the Southern Oceans 1939–45. Cape Town, London, New York: Oxford University Press. OCLC 1262012.
