= German submarine U-155 =

U-155 may refer to one of the following German submarines:

- SM U-155, a Type U 151 submarine launched in 1916; known as the merchant submarine Deutschland from launch; commissioned as U-155 on 19 February 1917; served in World War I until surrendered on 24 November 1918; used as an exhibition in London; broken up at Morecambe in 1922
  - During World War I, Germany also had this submarine with a similar name:
    - SM UB-155, a Type UB III submarine laid down but uncompleted at the end of the war; surrendered to France and became French submarine Jean Corre; broken up 1936
- German submarine U-155 (1941), a Type IXC submarine that served in World War II; taken to Loch Ryan on 30 June 1945; sunk on 21 December 1945 as a part of Operation Deadlight
