= German submarine U-533 =

German World War II submarine

History

Nazi Germany
- Name: U-533
- Ordered: 10 April 1941
- Builder: Deutsche Werft, Hamburg
- Yard number: 351
- Laid down: 17 February 1942
- Launched: 11 September 1942
- Commissioned: 25 November 1942
- Fate: Sunk on 16 October 1943

General characteristics
- Class & type: Type IXC/40 submarine
- Displacement: 1,144 t (1,126 long tons) surfaced; 1,257 t (1,237 long tons) submerged
- Length: 76.76 m (251 ft 10 in) o/a; 58.75 m (192 ft 9 in) pressure hull
- Beam: 6.86 m (22 ft 6 in) o/a; 4.44 m (14 ft 7 in) pressure hull
- Height: 9.60 m (31 ft 6 in)
- Draught: 4.67 m (15 ft 4 in)
- Installed power: 4,400 PS (3,200 kW; 4,300 bhp) (diesels); 1,000 PS (740 kW; 990 shp) (electric)
- Propulsion: 2 shafts; 2 × diesel engines; 2 × electric motors
- Speed: 18.3 knots (33.9 km/h; 21.1 mph) surfaced; 7.3 knots (13.5 km/h; 8.4 mph) submerged
- Range: 13,850 nmi (25,650 km; 15,940 mi) at 10 knots (19 km/h; 12 mph) surfaced; 63 nmi (117 km; 72 mi) at 4 knots (7.4 km/h; 4.6 mph) submerged
- Test depth: 230 m (750 ft)
- Complement: 4 officers, 44 enlisted
- Armament: 6 × torpedo tubes (4 bow, 2 stern); 22 × 53.3 cm (21 in) torpedoes; 1 × 10.5 cm (4.1 in) SK C/32 deck gun (180 rounds); 1 × 3.7 cm (1.5 in) SK C/30 AA gun; 1 × twin 2 cm FlaK 30 AA guns

Service record
- Part of: 4th U-boat Flotilla; 25 November 1942 – 30 April 1943; 10th U-boat Flotilla; 1 May – 16 October 1943
- Identification codes: M 50 650
- Commanders: Kptlt. Helmut Hennig; 25 November 1942 – 16 October 1943
- Operations: 2 patrols: 1st patrol: a. 15 April – 24 May 1943; b. 3 – 4 July 1943; 2nd patrol: 5 July – 16 October 1943
- Victories: None

German submarine U-533 was a Type IXC/40 U-boat of Nazi Germany's Kriegsmarine during World War II. The submarine was laid down on 17 February 1942 at the Deutsche Werft yard at Hamburg as yard number 351, launched on 11 September 1942 and commissioned on 25 November 1942 under the command of Kapitänleutnant Helmut Hennig. After training with the 4th U-boat Flotilla in the Baltic Sea, U-533 was transferred to the 10th flotilla for front-line service on 1 May 1943, and sunk in the Gulf of Oman on 16 October with one survivor, who was to sit out the war in an enjoyable internment in Sharjah, then a Trucial State and today one of the United Arab Emirates.

== Design ==
German Type IXC/40 submarines were slightly larger than the original Type IXCs. U-533 had a displacement of 1,144 tonnes (1,126 long tons) when at the surface and 1,257 tonnes (1,237 long tons) while submerged. The U-boat had a total length of 76.76 m (251 ft 10 in), a pressure hull length of 58.75 m (192 ft 9 in), a beam of 6.86 m (22 ft 6 in), a height of 9.60 m (31 ft 6 in), and a draught of 4.67 m (15 ft 4 in). The submarine was powered by two MAN M 9 V 40/46 supercharged four-stroke, nine-cylinder diesel engines producing a total of 4,400 metric horsepower (3,240 kW; 4,340 shp) for use while surfaced, two Siemens-Schuckert 2 GU 345/34 double-acting electric motors producing a total of 1,000 shaft horsepower (1,010 PS; 750 kW) for use while submerged. She had two shafts and two 1.92 m (6 ft) propellers. The boat was capable of operating at depths of up to 230 metres (750 ft).

The submarine had a maximum surface speed of 18.3 knots (33.9 km/h; 21.1 mph) and a maximum submerged speed of 7.3 knots (13.5 km/h; 8.4 mph). When submerged, the boat could operate for 63 nautical miles (117 km; 72 mi) at 4 knots (7.4 km/h; 4.6 mph); when surfaced, she could travel 13,850 nautical miles (25,650 km; 15,940 mi) at 10 knots (19 km/h; 12 mph). U-533 was fitted with six 53.3 cm (21 in) torpedo tubes (four fitted at the bow and two at the stern), 22 torpedoes, one 10.5 cm (4.13 in) SK C/32 naval gun, 180 rounds, and a 3.7 cm (1.5 in) SK C/30 as well as a 2 cm (0.79 in) C/30 anti-aircraft gun. The boat had a complement of forty-eight.

== Service history ==
=== First patrol ===
U-533 departed Kiel on 15 April 1943, and sailed out into the Atlantic, but came under repeated attack from Allied aircraft, giving it very little opportunity to cause any damage to shipping.

On 24 April U-533 was attacked by a Hudson light bomber of No. 269 Squadron RAF. The U-boat was moderately damaged by the attack, defending itself with its AA guns. The next day, 25 April, the submarine was attacked again from the air, this time by an American PBY-5A Catalina of United States Navy squadron VP-84. Three of the U-boat's gunners were injured, but the U-boat was not severely damaged. On 20 May U-533 was attacked by a Halifax heavy bomber of No. 502 Squadron RAF, without suffering any serious damage. The U-boat arrived at her new home port of Lorient in occupied France, on 24 May after 40 days at sea.

=== Second patrol ===
On 5 July 1943 the U-boat sailed from Lorient, through the Atlantic, around the Cape of Good Hope, into the Indian Ocean, and up to the mouth of the Persian Gulf.

Operating as part of the Monsun Gruppe, it was sunk in the Gulf of Oman on 16 October, in position 25°28′N 56°50′E, by depth charges dropped from a British Bisley (Blenheim) light bomber of No. 244 Squadron RAF, piloted by Lewis William Chapman. Of the crew of 53, only one survived; Matrosengefreiter Günther Schmidt, who was with an officer in the conning tower. The officer succeeded in opening the hatch, even though the submarine had sunk to a depth of 60 metres (200 ft). Without escape sets, the water pressure shot both men to the surface. Schmidt kept the unconscious officer afloat for an hour before he died, and Schmidt swam and stayed afloat without a life jacket for 28 hours until he was rescued by HMIS Hiravati near Khor Fakkan. Schmidt spent the remainder of the war as a POW. Chapman received the Distinguished Flying Medal for his action.

=== Wreck ===
In 2009, divers found the wreck of U-533 at a depth of 108 metres (354 ft) some 25 nautical miles (46 km; 29 mi) off the coast of Fujairah.

=== Wolfpacks ===
U-533 took part in three wolfpacks, namely:

- Star (27 April – 4 May 1943)
- Fink (4 – 6 May 1943)
- Monsun (5 July – 10 October 1943)

== Bibliography ==
- Busch, Rainer; Röll, Hans-Joachim (1999). German U-boat commanders of World War II : a biographical dictionary. Translated by Brooks, Geoffrey. London, Annapolis, Md: Greenhill Books, Naval Institute Press. ISBN 1-55750-186-6.
- Busch, Rainer; Röll, Hans-Joachim (1999). Deutsche U-Boot-Verluste von September 1939 bis Mai 1945 [German U-boat losses from September 1939 to May 1945]. Der U-Boot-Krieg (in German). Vol. IV. Hamburg, Berlin, Bonn: Mittler. ISBN 3-8132-0514-2.
- Gröner, Erich; Jung, Dieter; Maass, Martin (1991). U-boats and Mine Warfare Vessels. German Warships 1815–1945. Vol. 2. Translated by Thomas, Keith; Magowan, Rachel. London: Conway Maritime Press. ISBN 0-85177-593-4.
- Kemp, Paul (1999). U-Boats Destroyed - German Submarine Losses in the World Wars. London: Arms & Armour. ISBN 1-85409-515-3.
