= German submarine U-801 =

German World War II submarine

History

Nazi Germany
- Name: U-801
- Ordered: 7 December 1940
- Builder: DeSchiMAG Seebeckwerft, Bremerhaven
- Yard number: 359
- Laid down: 30 September 1941
- Launched: 31 October 1942
- Commissioned: 24 March 1943
- Fate: Scuttled on 17 March 1944

General characteristics
- Class & type: Type IXC/40 submarine
- Displacement: 1,144 t (1,126 long tons) surfaced; 1,257 t (1,237 long tons) submerged
- Length: 76.76 m (251 ft 10 in) o/a; 58.75 m (192 ft 9 in) pressure hull
- Beam: 6.86 m (22 ft 6 in) o/a; 4.44 m (14 ft 7 in) pressure hull
- Height: 9.60 m (31 ft 6 in)
- Draught: 4.67 m (15 ft 4 in)
- Installed power: 4,400 PS (3,200 kW; 4,300 bhp) (diesels); 1,000 PS (740 kW; 990 shp) (electric)
- Propulsion: 2 shafts; 2 × diesel engines; 2 × electric motors
- Speed: 19 knots (35 km/h; 22 mph) surfaced; 7.3 knots (13.5 km/h; 8.4 mph) submerged
- Range: 13,850 nmi (25,650 km; 15,940 mi) at 10 knots (19 km/h; 12 mph) surfaced; 63 nmi (117 km; 72 mi) at 4 knots (7.4 km/h; 4.6 mph) submerged
- Test depth: 230 m (750 ft)
- Complement: 4 officers, 44 enlisted
- Armament: 6 × torpedo tubes (4 bow, 2 stern); 22 × 53.3 cm (21 in) torpedoes; 1 × 10.5 cm (4.1 in) SK C/32 deck gun (180 rounds); 1 × 3.7 cm (1.5 in) SK C/30 AA gun; 1 × twin 2 cm FlaK 30 AA guns

Service record
- Part of: 4th U-boat Flotilla; 24 March – 31 October 1943; 2nd U-boat Flotilla; 1 November 1943 – 17 March 1944
- Identification codes: M 51 307
- Commanders: Kptlt. Hans-Joachim Brans; 24 March 1943 – 17 March 1944
- Operations: 2 patrols: 1st patrol: 13 November 1943 – 8 January 1944; 2nd patrol: 26 February – 17 March 1944
- Victories: None

German submarine U-801 was a Type IXC/40 U-boat built for Nazi Germany's Kriegsmarine during World War II.

U-801 was ordered on 7 December 1940 from DeSchiMAG Seebeckwerft in Geestemünde under the yard number 359. Her keel was laid down on 30 September 1941 and after eleven months of construction the U-boat was launched the following year on 31 October 1942. About six months later she was commissioned into service under the command of Kapitänleutnant Hans-Joachim Brans (Crew 35) in the 4th U-boat Flotilla.

== Design ==
German Type IXC/40 submarines were slightly larger than the original Type IXCs. U-801 had a displacement of 1,144 tonnes (1,126 long tons) when at the surface and 1,257 tonnes (1,237 long tons) while submerged. The U-boat had a total length of 76.76 m (251 ft 10 in), a pressure hull length of 58.75 m (192 ft 9 in), a beam of 6.86 m (22 ft 6 in), a height of 9.60 m (31 ft 6 in), and a draught of 4.67 m (15 ft 4 in). The submarine was powered by two MAN M 9 V 40/46 supercharged four-stroke, nine-cylinder diesel engines producing a total of 4,400 metric horsepower (3,240 kW; 4,340 shp) for use while surfaced, two Siemens-Schuckert 2 GU 345/34 double-acting electric motors producing a total of 1,000 shaft horsepower (1,010 PS; 750 kW) for use while submerged. She had two shafts and two 1.92 m (6 ft) propellers. The boat was capable of operating at depths of up to 230 metres (750 ft).

The submarine had a maximum surface speed of 18.3 knots (33.9 km/h; 21.1 mph) and a maximum submerged speed of 7.3 knots (13.5 km/h; 8.4 mph). When submerged, the boat could operate for 63 nautical miles (117 km; 72 mi) at 4 knots (7.4 km/h; 4.6 mph); when surfaced, she could travel 13,850 nautical miles (25,650 km; 15,940 mi) at 10 knots (19 km/h; 12 mph). U-801 was fitted with six 53.3 cm (21 in) torpedo tubes (four fitted at the bow and two at the stern), 22 torpedoes, one 10.5 cm (4.13 in) SK C/32 naval gun, 180 rounds, and a 3.7 cm (1.5 in) SK C/30 as well as a 2 cm (0.79 in) C/30 anti-aircraft gun. The boat had a complement of forty-eight.

== Service history ==
After a collision in the Baltic during work-up for deployment, U-801, now part of the 2nd U-boat Flotilla, left Swinemünde together with U-421 and U-734 on 7 November 1943 for Norway. Via Kristiansand and Stavanger, the U-boats reached Bergen two days later. Leaving Bergen the next week, U-801 joined wolfpack Coronel operating against convoy ONS 24 in the North Atlantic on 2 December 1943. For the rest of the month she patrolled in her assigned operation area and joined two more wolf-packs, Coronel 2 and Borkum until technical problems forced her to make for port. U-801 reached Lorient on 8 January 1944.

Her second patrol would have led her into the Indian Ocean as part of Monsun group, however U-801 was detected by a submarine hunter group three weeks into her journey. The submarine surfaced on the evening of March 16th only to be attacked by aircraft from the escort carrier USS Block Island. The U-boat dived and managed to evade the hunters until the early hours of the March 17th, when the U-801 skipper erred and sent a radio message. USS Corry ran down the bearing of the transmission, and she and USS Bronstein methodically boxed in the U-801, forcing her to surface. On the surface, she was immediately attacked by Corry. Nine crew members lost their lives in the attack. The crew abandoned and scuttled their boat at position 16°42′N 30°28′W. The remaining crew were picked up by Corry and later transferred to Block Island. The 47 survivors were brought to Norfolk, Virginia and spent the rest of the war in captivity.

=== Wolfpacks ===
U-801 took part in four wolfpacks, namely:

- Coronel (4 – 8 December 1943)
- Coronel 2 (8 – 14 December 1943)
- Coronel 3 (14 – 17 December 1943)
- Borkum (18 December 1943 – 3 January 1944)

== Bibliography ==
- Busch, Rainer; Röll, Hans-Joachim (1999). German U-boat commanders of World War II: a biographical dictionary. Translated by Brooks, Geoffrey. London, Annapolis, Md: Greenhill Books, Naval Institute Press. ISBN 1-55750-186-6.
- Busch, Rainer; Röll, Hans-Joachim (1999). Der U-Boot-Krieg, 1939-1945: Deutsche U-Boot-Verluste von September 1939 bis Mai 1945 [German U-boat losses from September 1939 to May 1945] (in German). Vol. IV. Hamburg, Berlin, Bonn: Mittler. ISBN 3-8132-0514-2.
- Gröner, Eric; Jung, Dieter; Maass, Martin (1991). German Warships 1815-1945: U-boats and Mine Warfare Vessels. Vol. 2. Translated by Thomas, Keith; Magowan, Rachel. London: Conway Maritime Press. ISBN 0-85177-593-4.
