= German submarine U-1062 =

German World War II submarine

History

Nazi Germany
- Name: U-1062
- Ordered: 25 August 1941
- Builder: Germaniawerft, Kiel
- Yard number: 696
- Laid down: 12 August 1942
- Launched: 8 May 1943
- Commissioned: 19 June 1943
- Fate: Sunk on 30 September 1944

General characteristics
- Class & type: Type VIIF submarine
- Displacement: 1,084 tonnes (1,067 long tons) surfaced; 1,181 t (1,162 long tons) submerged
- Length: 77.63 m (254 ft 8 in) o/a; 60.40 m (198 ft 2 in) pressure hull
- Beam: 7.30 m (23 ft 11 in) o/a; 4.70 m (15 ft 5 in) pressure hull
- Height: 9.60 m (31 ft 6 in)
- Draught: 4.91 m (16 ft 1 in)
- Installed power: 2,800–3,200 PS (2,100–2,400 kW; 2,800–3,200 bhp) (diesels); 750 PS (550 kW; 740 shp) (electric)
- Propulsion: 2 shafts; 2 × diesel engines; 2 × electric motors
- Speed: 16.9–17.6 knots (31.3–32.6 km/h; 19.4–20.3 mph) surfaced
- Range: 14,700 nmi (27,200 km; 16,900 mi) at 10 knots (19 km/h; 12 mph) surfaced; 75 nmi (139 km; 86 mi) at 4 knots (7.4 km/h; 4.6 mph) submerged
- Test depth: 200 m (660 ft); Calculated crush depth: 220–240 m (720–790 ft)
- Crew: 4 officers, 42 enlisted
- Armament: 5 × 53.3 cm (21 in) torpedo tubes (4 bow, 1 stern); 14 × torpedoes or up to 40 in transport role; 1 × 3.7 centimetres (1.5 in) SK C/30 anti-aircraft gun (1,195 rounds); 2 × 2 centimetres (0.79 in) Flak anti-aircraft guns (4,380 rounds)

Service record
- Part of: 5th U-boat Flotilla; 19 June – 31 December 1943; 12th U-boat Flotilla; 1 January – 30 September 1944
- Identification codes: M 52 909
- Commanders: Oblt.z.S. Karl Albrecht; 19 June 1943 – 30 September 1944
- Operations: 2 patrols: 1st patrol: a. 18 – 24 December 1943; b. 3 January – 19 April 1944; 2nd patrol: a. 19 June – 2 July 1944; b. 15 July – 30 September 1944
- Victories: None

German submarine U-1062 was one of a series of four Type VIIF submarine of Nazi Germany's Kriegsmarine during World War II.

U-1062 was one of four Type VIIF torpedo transport submarines, which could carry up to 40 torpedoes, and were used to re-supply other U-boats at sea. U-1062 commissioned on 19 June 1943, first served with 5th U-boat Flotilla for training and later served with 12th U-boat Flotilla from 1 January until 30 September 1944.

== Design ==
As one of the four German Type VIIF submarines, U-1062 had a displacement of 1,084 tonnes (1,067 long tons) when at the surface and 1,181 tonnes (1,162 long tons) while submerged. She had a total length of 77.63 m (254 ft 8 in), a pressure hull length of 60.40 m (198 ft 2 in), a beam of 7.30 m (23 ft 11 in), a height of 9.60 m (31 ft 6 in), and a draught of 4.91 m (16 ft 1 in). The submarine was powered by two Germaniawerft F46 supercharged four-stroke, six-cylinder diesel engines producing a total of 2,800 to 3,200 metric horsepower (2,060 to 2,350 kW; 2,760 to 3,160 shp) for use while surfaced, two AEG GU 460/8-276 double-acting electric motors producing a total of 750 shaft horsepower (760 PS; 560 kW) for use while submerged. She had two shafts and two 1.23 m (4 ft) propellers. The boat was capable of operating at depths of up to 230 metres (750 ft).

The submarine had a maximum surface speed of 16.9–17.6 knots (31.3–32.6 km/h; 19.4–20.3 mph) and a maximum submerged speed of 7.9 knots (14.6 km/h; 9.1 mph). When submerged, the boat could operate for 75 nautical miles (139 km; 86 mi) at 4 knots (7.4 km/h; 4.6 mph); when surfaced, she could travel 14,700 nautical miles (27,200 km; 16,900 mi) at 10 knots (19 km/h; 12 mph). U-1062 was fitted with five 53.3 cm (21 in) torpedo tubes (four fitted at the bow and one at the stern), fourteen torpedoes, one 8.8 cm (3.46 in) SK C/35 naval gun, 220 rounds, and various anti-aircraft guns. The boat had a complement of about forty-six.

== Service history ==
U-1062 left Kiel on 18 December 1943, arriving at Bergen on 24 December, where she remained until 3 January 1944, when she sailed for Penang, arriving on 19 April, loaded with spare torpedoes for the Monsun Gruppe. She left Penang on 15 July to return to Germany, but was intercepted on 30 September by a hunter-killer group based around the escort carrier USS Mission Bay in the central Atlantic, WSW of the Cape Verde Islands. U-1062 was sunk with all hands at 11°36′N 34°44′W by depth charges from the destroyer escort USS Fessenden.

== Bibliography ==
- Bishop, Chris (2006). Kriegsmarine U-Boats, 1939-45. London: Amber Books. ISBN 978-1-904687-96-2.
- Busch, Rainer; Röll, Hans-Joachim (1999). German U-boat commanders of World War II : a biographical dictionary. Translated by Brooks, Geoffrey. London, Annapolis, Md: Greenhill Books, Naval Institute Press. ISBN 1-55750-186-6.
- Busch, Rainer; Röll, Hans-Joachim (1999). Deutsche U-Boot-Verluste von September 1939 bis Mai 1945 [German U-boat losses from September 1939 to May 1945]. Der U-Boot-Krieg (in German). Vol. IV. Hamburg, Berlin, Bonn: Mittler. ISBN 3-8132-0514-2.
- Gröner, Erich; Jung, Dieter; Maass, Martin (1991). German Warships 1815–1945, U-boats and Mine Warfare Vessels. Vol. 2. Translated by Thomas, Keith; Magowan, Rachel. London: Conway Maritime Press. ISBN 0-85177-593-4.
