= USS Fessenden =

1943 Edsall-class destroyer escort

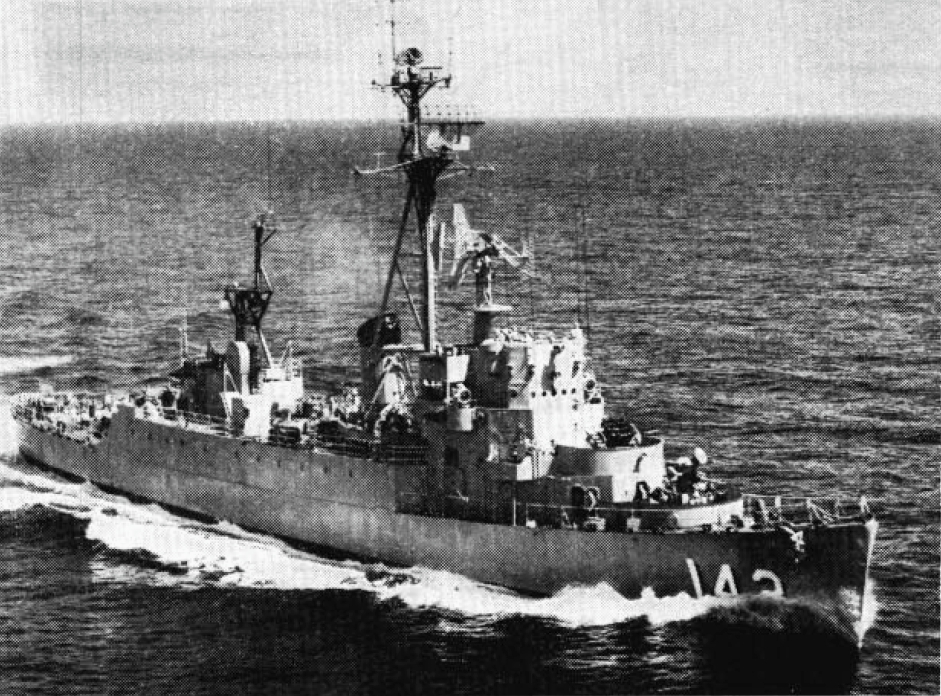
- USS Fessenden (DER-142) in 1956

History

United States
- Name: USS Fessenden
- Namesake: Reginald Aubrey Fessenden
- Builder: Consolidated Steel Corporation, Orange, Texas
- Laid down: 4 January 1943
- Launched: 9 March 1943
- Commissioned: 25 August 1943
- Decommissioned: 30 June 1960
- Reclassified: DER-142, 1 October 1951
- Stricken: 1 September 1966
- Honours and awards: 2 battle stars for World War II
- Fate: Sunk as target off Pearl Harbor, Hawaii, 20 December 1967

General characteristics
- Class & type: Edsall-class destroyer escort
- Displacement: 1,253 tons standard; 1,590 tons full load
- Length: 306 feet (93.27 m)
- Beam: 36.58 feet (11.15 m)
- Draft: 10.42 full load feet (3.18 m)
- Propulsion: 4 FM diesel engines, 4 diesel-generators, 6,000 shp (4.5 MW), 2 screws
- Speed: 21 knots (39 km/h)
- Range: 9,100 nmi. at 12 knots; (17,000 km at 22 km/h)
- Complement: 8 officers, 201 enlisted
- Armament: 3 × single 3 in (76 mm)/50 guns; 1 × twin 40 mm AA guns; 8 × single 20 mm AA guns; 1 × triple 21 in (533 mm) torpedo tubes; 8 × depth charge projectors; 1 × depth charge projector (hedgehog); 2 × depth charge tracks

USS Fessenden (DE-142/DER-142) was an Edsall-class destroyer escort built for the U.S. Navy during World War II. She served in the Atlantic Ocean and the Pacific Ocean and provided destroyer escort protection against submarine and air attack for Navy vessels and convoys.

She was named in honor of Reginald Aubrey Fessenden, born in Brome County, Quebec, Canada, 6 October 1866. He served as head chemist with Thomas Edison's East Orange, New Jersey, laboratories. In 1890 he began concentrating on electrical engineering, and through the next years made many important inventions and improvements in existing devices. His great contributions in the field of radio (particularly the invention of radio-telephony were of marked benefit not only to the Navy but to all seamen. He died 22 July 1932, at his home on Bermuda.

Fessenden (DE-142) was launched 9 March 1943 by Consolidated Steel Corp., Orange, Texas; sponsored by Mrs. R. K. Fessenden, daughter-in-law of the ship's namesake; and commissioned 25 August 1943. She was reclassified DER-142 on 1 October 1951.

== World War II Atlantic Ocean operations ==
After a period at Norfolk, Virginia, as training ship for crews for escorts soon to be commissioned, Fessenden carried out an escort mission to the Panama Canal Zone, returning to Norfolk 5 November 1943. Between 23 November and 18 March 1944, she escorted convoys on two voyages to Casablanca, then on 3 April sailed again to guard a convoy to Bizerte. Off Bone 20 April the convoy came under heavy air attack, one guardian destroyer being sunk, and on the homeward bound passage, the convoy screen lost two more destroyers to submarine attack. Fessenden returned safely to New York 21 May.

She sailed from Norfolk next on 12 June 1944, and escorted a convoy as far as Gibraltar, where she was detached to escort two captured Italian submarines to Bermuda. One developed engine trouble 2 July and was ordered back to Gibraltar, but Fessenden reached Bermuda with the other 16 July. Returning to New York 22 July, she was briefly overhauled, then sailed out of New London, Connecticut, training submarines from 3 August to 2 September. Next came special training off Maine, and her return to Norfolk to join the hunter-killer group formed around USS Mission Bay (CVE-59).

== Sinking of German submarine U-1062 ==
Operating with this group south of the Cape Verde Islands on 30 September 1944, Fessenden and two other ships investigated a contact, making a depth charge attack late in the afternoon, sinking U-1062 in 11°36′N 34°44′W. The group continued its antisubmarine patrols in the South Atlantic refueling at Dakar, French West Africa, Bahia and Recife, Brazil, and Cape Town, South Africa. Fessenden returned to New York 26 November, joined in training exercises in Long Island Sound, then off Guantánamo Bay, until 19 January 1945 when she reported to Miami, Florida, to serve as school ship for the Naval Training Center for a month.

She returned to Guantanamo 12 February 1945 to rejoin the Mission Bay group as it provided air cover for a convoy northeast of Bermuda carrying President F. D. Roosevelt home from the Yalta Conference. After brief overhaul at New York, she sailed north to Argentia, Newfoundland, with her hunter-killer group to work with similar task organizations in setting up a barrier patrol in the North Atlantic, to prevent German submarines from approaching the United States during the last days of the European war.

== Transfer to the Pacific Ocean ==
Fessenden served at New London, Connecticut, and Quonset Point, Rhode Island, in May and June 1945, aiding in the training of submariners and aviators. On 28 June, she sailed from New York for training at Guantanamo Bay and Pearl Harbor en route to the Marshall Islands. On 17 September, her commanding officer became representative of the Majuro Atoll Commander for the Japanese Naval Garrison at Wotje, and Fessenden lay at Wotje to supervise its demilitarization and the evacuation of the Japanese until 4 December. She cleared Eniwetok 4 January 1946 for San Diego, California, New York City, and Green Cove Springs, Florida, where she was decommissioned and placed in reserve 24 June 1946.

== Converted to radar picket ship ==
Fessenden was converted for radar picket duty at Boston, Massachusetts, where she was recommissioned 4 March 1952. After antisubmarine training out of Key West, Florida, Fessenden returned to her home port, Newport, Rhode Island, 25 September 1952 to begin duty on the radar picket stations of the North Atlantic. She returned from her sea patrols only for necessary maintenance and refresher training. With her division, she sailed from Newport 15 July 1957 for Pearl Harbor, her home port for Pacific early warning radar picket duty from 18 August 1957 until 18 March 1960 when she left the Hawaiians for San Francisco, California.

== Final decommissioning ==
On 30 June 1960, she was decommissioned and placed in reserve at Stockton, California. On 1 September 1966, she was struck from the Navy list. She was sunk as target of Pearl Harbor, Hawaii, 20 December 1967.

== Awards ==
Fessenden received two battle stars for World War II service.
