= German submarine U-161 =

U-161 may refer to one of the following German submarines:

- SM U-161, a Type U 93 submarine launched in 1918; served in World War I until surrendered on 20 November 1918; grounded on English east coast on way to be broken up, 1921
- German submarine U-161 (1941), a Type IXC submarine that served in World War II until sunk on 27 September 1943
