= List of shipwrecks in December 1861 =

The list of shipwrecks in December 1861 includes ships sunk, foundered, grounded, or otherwise lost during December 1861.

== 1 December ==
List of shipwrecks: 1 December 1861
Ship	State	Description
Adler	Flag unknown	The ship was wrecked on Saaremaa, Russia. Her crew were rescued. She was on a voyage from Riga, Russia to Antwerp, Belgium.
Antaris	United Kingdom	The ship was driven ashore at Porthdinllaen, Caernarfonshire. She was on a voyage from Newport, Monmouthshire to Liverpool, Lancashire.
Eldorado	United Kingdom	The ship was driven ashore and wrecked on the Isle of Mull, Inner Hebrides. Her crew were rescued. She was on a voyage from Quebec City, Province of Canada, British North America to Liverpool, Lancashire.
Stadt Emden	Kingdom of Hanover	The ship was wrecked on Saaremaa. Her crew were rescued. She was on a voyage from Riga to London, United Kingdom.
Willem Eduard	Netherlands	The schooner was run into by a steamship and was beached 3 nautical miles (5.6 km) west of Rye, Sussex, United Kingdom, where she became a wreck. She was on a voyage from Buenos Aires, Argentina to London.

== 2 December ==
List of shipwrecks: 2 December 1861
Ship	State	Description
Corsair	United Kingdom	The steamship was driven ashore in Sheephaven Bay. She was on a voyage from Liverpool, Lancashire to Galway.
Mary	United Kingdom	The schooner sprang a leak and sank 2 nautical miles (3.7 km) off St. Abb's Head, Berwickshire. Her crew were rescued. She was on a voyage from Crail, Fife to Newcastle upon Tyne, Northumberland.
Tangier	United Kingdom	The ship was driven ashore at Bathurst, New Brunswick, British North America. She was on a voyage from New York, United States to Bathurst and Liverpool. She was refloated on 11 January 1862 and resumed her voyage.
Unnamed	Flag unknown	The brigantine collided with Theresa (United Kingdom) in the Irish Sea and foundered with the loss of all hands.

== 3 December ==
List of shipwrecks: 3 December 1861
Ship	State	Description
Ben Lomond	United Kingdom	The ship was driven ashore at Father Point, Province of Canada, British North America. She was on a voyage from Quebec City, Province of Canada to Hull, Yorkshire.
Betsey	United Kingdom	The ship was wrecked at Tønsberg, Norway.
Czar	United Kingdom	The ship was driven ashore in Plaster Cove, Cape Breton Island, Nova Scotia, British North America. She was on a voyage from Quebec City to Liverpool, Lancashire.
Deslandea	(United Kingdom of Great Britain and Ireland) Jersey	The ship was wrecked at Saint-Malo, Ille-et-Vilaine. Her crew were rescued. She was on a voyage from Sunderland, County Durham to Saint-Malo.
Diligence	United Kingdom	The ship was driven ashore and wrecked at Lowestoft, Suffolk.
Harold	United Kingdom	The ship was driven ashore at Escoumins, Province of Canada. She was on a voyage from Quebec City to London. She was subsequently condemned.
Ira Russell	United States	The ship was driven ashore on Brigantine Beach Island, New Jersey.
Margaret	United Kingdom	The schooner foundered in the North Sea 10 nautical miles (19 km) off St. Abb's Head, Berwickshire. Her crew survived. She was on a voyage from Crail, Fife to Newcastle upon Tyne, Northumberland.
Moira	United Kingdom	The brig was wrecked on Scroby Sands, Norfolk. Her crew were rescued. She was on a voyage from Sunderland, County Durham to London.
Sir Colin Campbell	United Kingdom	The ship was driven ashore on Green Island, British North America. She was on a voyage from Montreal, Province of Canada to London.
Vigilant	United States	American Civil War: During a voyage in ballast from New York City to Sombrero in the West Indies, where her crew intended to collect guano, the 1,100-ton armed full-rigged ship was captured and burned in the North Atlantic Ocean several hundred miles southeast of Bermuda at 29°10′N 57°22′W by the merchant raider CSS Sumter (Confederate States Navy).

== 4 December ==
List of shipwrecks: 4 December 1861
Ship	State	Description
Ann	United Kingdom	The sloop was abandoned in the North Sea off Skinningrove, Yorkshire. She was on a voyage from West Hartlepool, County Durham to Sandsend, Yorkshire.
Falcon	United Kingdom	The schooner struck rocks of Horse Isle, in the Firth of Clyde and was abandoned. She was on a voyage from Rouen, Seine-Inférieure, France to Glasgow, Renfrewshire. She was subsequently towed in to Ardrossan, Ayrshire in a severely leaky condition.
Fetisch	Hamburg	The barque was driven ashore and severely damaged at Newbiggin-by-the-Sea, Northumberland, United Kingdom. She was on a voyage from Bremen to the River Tyne. She was refloated.
Lady Franklin	United States	The full-rigged ship caught fire at Plymouth, Devon, United Kingdom and was scuttled. Her crew survived. She was on a voyage from London, United Kingdom to New York.
Orion	Bremen	The ship was wrecked on the Cannon Rock, in the Belfast Lough. She was on a voyage from Falmouth, Cornwall, United Kingdom to the Clyde.
Seraphine	United Kingdom	The brig ran aground on the East Scar Rocks, off the coast of Yorkshire. She was on a voyage from Rotterdam, South Holland, Netherlands to Sunderland, County Durham. She was refloated.
Tohernaia	France	The brig was driven ashore 3 nautical miles (5.6 km) north of Blyth, Northumberland. She was refloated and taken in to Blyth.
Totnes	United Kingdom	The schooner ran aground, capsized and was severely damaged at Eyemouth, Berwickshire. She was on a voyage from Hartlepool, County Durham to Buckie, Banffshire.
Welcome Friend	United Kingdom	The Humber Keel ran aground on the Whitton Sand, in the Humber and capsized with the loss of three of the four people on board. She was on a voyage from New Holland, Lincolnshire to Castleford, Yorkshire.

== 5 December ==
List of shipwrecks: 5 December 1861
Ship	State	Description
Martha	United Kingdom	The ship was driven ashore at Baltimore, County Cork. She was on a voyage from Cardiff, Glamorgan to Tralee, County Kerry.
Orion	United Kingdom	The ship was driven ashore at Cromer, Norfolk. She was on a voyage from South Shields, County Durham to Rio de Janeiro, Brazil. She refloated and towed in to Great Yarmouth, Norfolk.
Patrician	United Kingdom	The ship struck the quayside and was severely damaged at Newcastle upon Tyne, Northumberland.
USS Phoenix	United States Navy	American Civil War, Union blockade: The former whaler was scuttled as part of the "Stone Fleet" to form a breakwater off Tybee Island, Georgia.
Rambler	United Kingdom	The ship was abandoned in the Atlantic Ocean. She was on a voyage from Nassau, Bahamas to Falmouth, Cornwall.

== 6 December ==
List of shipwrecks: 6 December 1861
Ship	State	Description
Dewdrop	United Kingdom	The ship was abandoned in the Atlantic Ocean. Her crew were rescued by Percy (United Kingdom). Dewdrop was on a voyage from Swansea, Glamorgan to Alicante, Spain.
Eagle	United Kingdom	The brig was wrecked at Aberdeen and wrecked with the loss of two of her six crew. One of the survivors was rescued by the Aberdeen Lifeboat. She was on a voyage from Newcastle upon Tyne, Northumberland to Aberdeen.
Eleanor and Mary	United Kingdom	The ship was driven ashore at Seascale, Cumberland. Her crew were rescued. She was on a voyage from Cardiff, Glamorgan to Maryport, Cumberland.
Elizabeth Barclay	United Kingdom	The schooner collided with the sloop Aid (United Kingdom) and was beached at Thurso, Caithness.
Foyle Packet	United Kingdom	The schooner was driven ashore at Hurst Point, Hampshire. She was on a voyage from Swansea, Glamorgan to Cowes, Isle of Wight. She was refloated but had to be beached at Yarmouth, Isle of Wight.
Portia	United Kingdom	The brig ran aground on the Shipwash Sand, in the North Sea off the coast of Suffolk. She was on a voyage from South Shields, County Durham to London. She was refloated and assisted in to Great Yarmouth, Norfolk in a leaky condition.
Rumble	United Kingdom	The barque was abandoned in the Atlantic Ocean. Her crew were rescued by Minnesota (United States). Rumble was on a voyage from Nassau, Bahamas to Falmouth, Cornwall.
Unnamed	United Kingdom	The schooner was driven ashore at Silecroft, Cumberland. She was on a voyage from Liverpool, Lancashire to Silloth, Cumberland.

== 7 December ==
List of shipwrecks: 7 December 1862
Ship	State	Description
Acorn	United Kingdom	The ship was driven ashore and wrecked near Rye, Sussex. She was on a voyage from Berbice, British Guiana to London.
Armais	United Kingdom	The barque was wrecked on the Haisborough Sands, in the North Sea off the coast of Norfolk. All eighteen people on board survived. She was on a voyage from West Hartlepool, County Durham to Africa.
Ann	United Kingdom	The smack was driven ashore at the Point of Ayr Lighthouse, Cheshire. Her crew were rescued.
Cato	United Kingdom	The ship was driven ashore at Redcar, Yorkshire. She was on a voyage from North Shields, Northumberland to Havre de Grâce, Seine-Inférieure, France She was refloated and resumed her voyage.
Eagle	United Kingdom	The schooner was driven ashore and wrecked at Aberdeen with the loss of two of her crew. She was on a voyage from Newcastle upon Tyne, Northumberland to Aberdeen.
Garland	United Kingdom	The brig was driven ashore on Flat Holm, Glamorgan. She was on a voyage from Cork to Newport, Monmouthshire.
Gustof	Sweden	The schooner was wrecked at "Sloenska Hogane". Her crew were rescued by Johanne Ehlert (Sweden). Gustof was on a voyage from Hull, Yorkshire, United Kingdom to Gävle.
Harper	United Kingdom	The brig was wrecked on Scroby Sands, Norfolk. Her crew were rescued. She was on a voyage from Middlesbrough, Yorkshire to London.
Lanoy	Norway	The full-rigged ship ran aground on "Axholme". She was on a voyage from Sundene to London. She was refloated and taken in to Gothenburg, Sweden in a leaky condition.
Mermaid	United Kingdom	The ship sank off Silecroft, Cumberland. Her crew were rescued. She was on a voyage from London to Carlisle, Cumberland.
Messenger	United States	The 254-ton steamer was stranded on the Ohio River at Rochester, Pennsylvania.
Quebec	United Kingdom	The ship was wrecked on "Bryant Island". Her crew were rescued. She was on a voyage from Montreal, Province of Canada, British North America to Liverpool, Lancashire.
Sally	United Kingdom	The ship was driven ashore at Youghal, County Cork. She was on a voyage from Youghal to Neath, Glamorgan. She was refloated and taken in to Youghal in a waterlogged condition.

== 8 December ==
List of shipwrecks: 8 December 1861
Ship	State	Description
Columbus	United Provinces of Central America	The steamship was wrecked on the Punto Remedios Reef, off Sonsonate. All on board were rescued. She was on a voyage from Panama City, Granadine Confederation to Acajutla.
USS Cossack	United States	American Civil War, Union blockade: The 254- or 256-ton barque, a former whaler, was beached at Tybee Island, Georgia, to form a wharf.
Ebenezer Dodge	United States	American Civil War: Sailing from New Bedford, Massachusetts, to the Pacific Ocean with a crew of 22, the whaler, a barque, was captured and burned in the North Atlantic Ocean at 30°57′N 051°49′W by the merchant raider CSS Sumter (Confederate States Navy).
USS Peter Demill	United States Navy	American Civil War, Union blockade: The barque was beached at Tybee Island, Georgia, to form a wharf.
USS South America	United States Navy	American Civil War, Union blockade: The former whaler was beached at Tybee Island, Georgia, to form a wharf.

== 9 December ==
List of shipwrecks: 9 December 1861
Ship	State	Description
Annie	United Kingdom	The barque was driven ashore at Redcar, Yorkshire. She was on a voyage from London to Hartlepool, County Durham. She was refloated.
Armais	United Kingdom	The barque was wrecked on the Haisborough Sands, in the North Sea off the coast of Norfolk. She was on a voyage from Hartlepool to Arica, Peru.
Capricieuse	France	The schooner was driven ashore near Bridgwater, Somerset, United Kingdom. She was on a voyage from Dunkirk, Nord to Cardiff, Glamorgan, United Kingdom.
Columbus	United States	The screw steamer was stranded at Punta Remedos, El Salvador.
Meteor	United Kingdom	The steamship collided with a junk at Woosung, China and was beached. Her crew were rescued.
Unnamed	Flags unknown	The barques were wrecked at Odesa.

== 10 December ==
List of shipwrecks: 10 December 1861
Ship	State	Description
Annie Taylor	United States	The screw steamer was wrecked at Sabine Pass on the Gulf of Mexico coast of the Confederate States of America on the border between Louisiana and Texas.
Anomia	United Kingdom	The ship was abandoned in the Atlantic Ocean. She was on a voyage from New York, United States to Glasgow, Renfrewshire.
Elizabeth Ferguson	United Kingdom	The ship was driven ashore and wrecked at "Horkand", Sweden. She was on a voyage from Danzig to London.
Fredericke Wilhelmine	Danzig	The ship collided with Stadt Frankfurt (Flag unknown) and was abandoned. Her crew were rescued. Fredericke Wilhelmine was on a voyage from Hartlepool, County Durham, United Kingdom to Danzig. She was taken in to "Brakkeston", near Lillesand, Norway.
John Wood	United Kingdom	The ship departed from Calcutta, India for Mauritius. No further trace, presumed foundered with the loss of all hands.
Maria	United Kingdom	The schooner was driven ashore and wrecked in Lough Swilly with the loss of a crew member. She was on a voyage from Rutland Island, County Donegal to Glasgow, Renfrewshire.
Nicholas Wood	United Kingdom	The steamship departed from Gibraltar for London. No further trace, presumed foundered with the loss of all hands.

== 11 December ==
List of shipwrecks: 11 December 1861
Ship	State	Description
Adelaide	United Kingdom	The ship was driven ashore at "Killa".
Carolina	Confederate States of America	American Civil War:The Schooner was driven ashore in the St. John's River, Florida by USS Bienville (United States Navy).
Catherine	United Kingdom	The brig was driven ashore at Lowestoft, Suffolk. She was on a voyage from South Shields, County Durham to London.
Doctor	United Kingdom	The ship was wrecked on the Swedish coast. Her crew were rescued. She was on a voyage from Danzig to Fleetwood, Lancashire.
Ferme	United Kingdom	The ship ran aground at Dundee, Forfarshire. She was on a voyage from Dundee to London. She was refloated and put back to Dundee in a leaky condition.
General Stricker	United States	The barque was driven ashore and wrecked at Tacumshane, County Wexford. United Kingdom. She was on a voyage from Iquique, Chile to Liverpool, Lancashire, United Kingdom.
Hermione	United Kingdom	The ship was damaged by fire at Liverpool.
James Montgomery	United States	The 536-ton sidewheel paddle steamer struck a snag and sank in the Mississippi River at Devil's Island near Cape Girardeau, Missouri.

== 12 December ==
List of shipwrecks: 12 December 1861
Ship	State	Description
Content	United Kingdom	The brig struck a sunken wreck and was consequently beached 2 nautical miles (3.7 km) north of Dunwich, Suffolk. Her five crew were rescued by the Thorpeness Lifeboat. She was on a voyage from Sunderland, County Durham to London.
Cumloden Castle	United Kingdom	The ship was driven ashore and wrecked at Bannow, County Wexford. Her crew were rescued. She was on a voyage from Quebec City, Province of Canada, British North America to Ardrossan, Ayrshire.
Isabella	United Kingdom	The schooner was wrecked on The Skerries, off the coast of Anglesey with the loss of all hands.
Lowestoft Packet	United Kingdom	The schooner sank at Bridlington, Yorkshire. She was on a voyage from Sunderland to Lowestoft, Suffolk.
Ocean Queen	United Kingdom	The ship was driven ashore at Hartlepool, County Durham. She was on a voyage from the River Tyne to Hartlepool. She was refloated.
Queen of the Seas	United Kingdom	The ship ran aground on the Middle Ground Shoal. She was on a voyage from Bombay, India to Akyab, Burma. She was refloated and taken in to Mazagan, India in a sinking condition and was beached there.

== 13 December ==
List of shipwrecks: 13 December 1861
Ship	State	Description
Caroline	United Kingdom	The barque sprang a leak and sank in the Atlantic Ocean (46°50′N 9°03′W) with the loss of three of her twelve crew. Survivors were rescued by the brig Fiumano ( Austrian Empire). Caroline was on a voyage from Sulina, Ottoman Empire to Cork.
Elizabeth	United Kingdom	The barque foundered in the Atlantic Ocean (30°31′N 20°27′W). Her crew were rescued by the brigantine Janet Kidston ( (United Kingdom of Great Britain and Ireland) British North America). Elizabeth was on a voyage from New York, United States to Dublin.
Königsberg	Prussia	The ship ran aground on the Swinebottom, in the Baltic Sea. She was refloated and taken in to Copenhagen, Denmark.
Odin	Denmark	The steamship ran aground on the Swinebottom. She was refloated and taken in to Copenhagen.
Pride	United Kingdom	The brigantine was driven ashore at Plymouth, Devon. She was on a voyage from Newcastle upon Tyne, Northumberland to Limerick.
Sea Nymph	United Kingdom	The steamship ran aground at Whitby, Yorkshire. She was refloated.

== 14 December ==
List of shipwrecks: 14 December 1861
Ship	State	Description
Admiral	United Kingdom	The barque departed from New York, United States for Queenstown, County Cork. No further trace, presumed foundered with the loss of all 27 crew.
Alma	United Kingdom	The barque was wrecked in Guichen Bay. Her crew were rescued.
Boyne	United Kingdom	The ship was abandoned in the Atlantic Ocean. Her fourteen-plus crew were rescued by the barque Daphne (Norway). Boyne was on a voyage from New York, United States to Fleetwood, Lancashire.
Caroline	United Kingdom	The ship sprang a leak and sank in the Atlantic Ocean (46°50′N 9°03′W) with the loss of three of her twelve crew. Survivors were rescued by the brig Fumano ( Austrian Empire).
Filomena	Austrian Empire	The barque sprang a leak and foundered off Trinidad. Her crew survived. She was on a voyage from Demerara, British Guiana to Falmouth, Cornwall or Queenstown, County Cork, United Kingdom.
Northern Light	United Kingdom	The brig foundered in the Gut of Canso with the loss of all hands. She was on a voyage from New York to Newfoundland, British North America.
Sarah Fleming	United Kingdom	The ship was abandoned in the Atlantic Ocean. Her crew were rescued by Gorilla (United Kingdom). Sarah Fleming was on a voyage from Quebec City, Province of Canada, British North America to Torquay, Devon.

== 15 December ==
List of shipwrecks: 15 December 1861
Ship	State	Description
Arethusa	United Kingdom	The ship departed from Calcutta, India for London. No further trace, presumed foundered with the loss of all hands.
Charity	Confederate States of America	American Civil War, Union blockade: Carrying general cargo including coffee, salt, shoes, and sugar, the 128-ton schooner was wrecked at Hatteras Inlet on the coast of North Carolina while being pursued by the screw gunboat USS Stars and Stripes (United States Navy).
Emtragt	Prussia	The ship was wrecked on Anholt, Denmark. Her crew survived. She was on a voyage from Newcastle upon Tyne, Northumberland, United Kingdom to Memel.
Irene	United Kingdom	The ship was driven ashore at Harboøre, Denmark. Her crew were rescued. She was on a voyage from Trieste to London.
Maria	United Kingdom	The ship struck the quayside at Newcastle upon Tyne and was left in a severely leaky condition. She was on a voyage from Newcastle upon Tyne to London.
Patrician	United Kingdom	The ship ran aground at Tynemouth, Northumberland. She was refloated with assistance from several tugs and resumed her voyage.
Peggy	United Kingdom	The brig collided with Nautilus (United Kingdom) and was abandoned in the North Sea. Her crew were rescued by Nautilus.
Pizarro	Spain	The barque was discovered abandoned in the English Channel 24 nautical miles (44 km) south west of Start Point, Devon, United Kingdom. She was on a voyage from Santander to Havana, Cuba. She was towed in to Torbay by the brig Sir Charles Napier (Norway).
Queen of Sheba	United Kingdom	The barque was abandoned in the Atlantic Ocean (39°05′N 63°41′W), being in a sinking condition. Her crew were rescued by the full-rigged ship Highland Light (United States). Queen of Sheba was on a voyage from New York, United States to Queenstown, County Cork.
Unidentified schooner	Spain	American Civil War, Union blockade: Carrying a cargo of coffee, cigars, blankets, shoes, and other goods, the schooner was driven ashore and burned off St. Andrews, Georgia, by the armed sidewheel paddle steamers USS Bienville and USS Alabama (both United States Navy).

== 16 December ==
List of shipwrecks: 16 December 1861
Ship	State	Description
Livingstone	United Kingdom	The full-rigged ship was driven ashore and wrecked in Guichen Bay. Her crew were rescued by the Robstown Lifeboat.
Nicholas Wood	United Kingdom	The ship departed from Gibraltar for London. No further trace, presumed foundered with the loss of all hands.
Princess	United Kingdom	The brig sprang a leak and was run ashore at Flamborough Head, Yorkshire, where she subsequently became a wreck. Her crew were rescued by Ariel (United Kingdom). Princess was on a voyage from South Shields, County Durham to London.
Surprise	United Kingdom	The ship was driven ashore near "Melazzo", Italy. Her crew were rescued. She was on a voyage from Messina, Sicily, Italy to Liverpool, Lancashire.

== 17 December ==
List of shipwrecks: 17 December 1861
Ship	State	Description
Oscar	(United Kingdom of Great Britain and Ireland) Victoria (Australia)	The steamer was wrecked on a sandbar at the mouth of the New River, New Zealand, while approaching Invercargill. She was on a Port Chalmers to Melbourne run.
Surprise	United Kingdom	The ship was driven ashore near Milazzo, Sicily, Italy. She was on a voyage from Messina, Sicily to Liverpool, Lancashire. She was consequently condemned.
Susan	(United Kingdom of Great Britain and Ireland) Jersey	The schooner was abandoned in the Atlantic Ocean with the loss of a crew member. Survivors were rescued by Espeigle ( (United Kingdom of Great Britain and Ireland) British North America). Susan was on a voyage from the Nickerie River to Liverpool.

== 18 December ==
List of shipwrecks: 18 December 1861
Ship	State	Description
Epimachus	Netherlands	The schooner collided with a brig and was beached at Berwick upon Tweed, Northumberland, United Kingdom, where she subsequently became a wreck. Her five crew were rescued by the Berwick Lifeboat. She was on a voyage from South Shields, County Durham to Fisherrow, Lothian, United Kingdom.
Ganges	United Kingdom	The brig ran aground on the Longsand, in the North Sea off the coast of Essex. She was on a voyage from South Shields, County Durham to Havre de Grâce, Seine-Inférieure, France. She was refloated with the assistance of six smacks and taken in to Harwich, Essex.
Maid of Aln	United Kingdom	The schooner ran aground on the Parten Steel, off the coast of Northumberland. She was on a voyage from Sunderland, County Durham to Alnmouth, Northumberland. She was refloated and beached at Lindisfarne, Northumberland.
Teresina	United Kingdom	The ship departed from Cardiff, Glamorgan for Malta. No further trace, presumed foundered with the loss of all hands.
Trelawney	(United Kingdom of Great Britain and Ireland) Jamaica	The sloop was lost near "Musputoleone".
Wanderer	United Kingdom	The ship ran aground at Lowestoft, Suffolk. She was on a voyage from South Shields to Lowestoft. She was refloated.
Unnamed	United Kingdom	The lugger foundered off Bournemouth, Hampshire with the loss of five of her seven crew.

== 19 December ==
List of shipwrecks: 19 December 1861
Ship	State	Description
USS Amazon	United States Navy	American Civil War, Union blockade: The 318- or 319-ton barque, a former whaler filled with 325 short tons (295 metric tons/tonnes) of stone, was scuttled as a blockship on 19 or 20 December 3 nautical miles (5.6 km) southeast of Morris Island in the Main Ship Channel of Charleston Harbor off Charleston, South Carolina, as part of the "Stone Fleet". In little over a week the stone cargo sank deep into the mud and the rest of the ship broke up by wave action, a total failure.
America	United States	American Civil War, Union blockade: The 418-ton full-rigged ship, a former whaler, was scuttled as a blockship 3 nautical miles (5.6 km) southeast of Morris Island in the Main Ship Channel of Charleston Harbor off Charleston, South Carolina, as part of the "Stone Fleet" on 19 or 20 December. In little over a week the stone cargo sank deep into the mud and the rest of the ship broke up by wave action, a total failure.
USS American	United States Navy	American Civil War, Union blockade: The 275 or 329-ton barque, a former whaler loaded with 300 short tons (272 metric tons/tonnes) of stone, was scuttled as a blockship 3 nautical miles (5.6 km) southeast of Morris Island in the Main Ship Channel of Charleston Harbor off Charleston, South Carolina, as part of the "Stone Fleet" on 19 or 20 December. In little over a week the stone cargo sank deep into the mud and the rest of the ship broke up by wave action, a total failure.
USS Archer	United States Navy	American Civil War, Union blockade: The 321-ton full-rigged ship, a former whaler loaded with 300 short tons (272 metric tons/tonnes) of stone, was scuttled as a blockship in the main channel of Charleston Harbor off Charleston, South Carolina, as part of the "Stone Fleet" on 19 or 20 December. In little over a week the stone cargo sank deep into the mud and the rest of the ship broke up by wave action, a total failure.
Clementine	United Kingdom	The schooner collided with another vessel and was beached at Cowes, Isle of Wight. She was on a voyage from Lyme, Dorset to Newcastle upon Tyne, Northumberland. She was consequently condemned.
Courier	United States	American Civil War, Union blockade: The 381-ton full-rigged ship, a former whaler loaded with 360 short tons (327 metric tons/tonnes) of stone, was scuttled as a blockship 3 nautical miles (5.6 km) southeast of Morris Island in the Main Ship Channel of Charleston Harbor off Charleston, South Carolina, as part of the "Stone Fleet" on 19 or 20 December. In little over a week the stone cargo sank deep into the mud and the rest of the ship broke up by wave action, a total failure.
Ellen and Mary	United Kingdom	The schooner collided with another schooner off St. Catherine's Point, Isle of Wight and sank. Her crew were rescued by the schooner Gazelle (United Kingdom). Ellen and Mary was on a voyage from Newcastle upon Tyne to Portmadoc, Caernarfonshire.
Empress of the Seas	United Kingdom	The clipper caught fire at Point Nepean, Victoria. All on board were rescued. She was scuttled the next day.
Fortune	United States	American Civil War, Union blockade: The 291–, 292-, or 310-ton barque, a former whaler, was scuttled as a blockship off Morris Island in the Main Ship Channel of Charleston Harbor off Charleston, South Carolina, as part of the "Stone Fleet" on 19 or 20 December. In little over a week the stone cargo sank deep into the mud and the rest of the ship broke up by wave action, a total failure.
USS Garland	United States Navy	American Civil War, Union blockade: The vessel was scuttled as a blockship on 19 or 20 December as part of the "Stone Fleet." In little over a week the stone cargo sank deep into the mud and the rest of the ship broke up by wave action, a total failure.
USS Herald	United States Navy	American Civil War, Union blockade: The 274-ton full-rigged ship, a former whaler loaded with 240 short tons (218 metric tons/tonnes) of stone, was scuttled as a blockship off Morris Island in Charleston Harbor in Charleston, South Carolina, as part of the "Stone Fleet" on 19 or 20 December. In little over a week the stone cargo sank deep into the mud and the rest of the ship broke up by wave action, a total failure.
USS Kensington	United States Navy	American Civil War, Union blockade: The 357- or 400-ton full-rigged ship, loaded with 350 short tons (318 metric tons/tonnes) of stone, was scuttled as a blockship 3 nautical miles (5.6 km) southeast of Morris Island in the Main Ship Channel of Charleston Harbor off Charleston, South Carolina, as part of the "Stone Fleet" on 19 or 20 December. In little over a week the stone cargo sank deep into the mud and the rest of the ship broke up by wave action, a total failure.
USS L. C. Richmond	United States Navy	American Civil War, Union blockade: The 341-, 350-, or 383-ton full-rigged ship, a former whaler loaded with 200 short tons (181 metric tons/tonnes) of stone, was scuttled as a blockship about 3 nautical miles (5.6 km) southeast of Morris Island in the Main Ship Channel of Charleston Harbor off Charleston, South Carolina, as part of the "Stone Fleet" on 19 or 20 December. In little over a week the stone cargo sank deep into the mud and the rest of the ship broke up by wave action, a total failure.
USS Leonidas	United States Navy	American Civil War,[Union blockade: The 231- or 320-ton barque, a former whaler loaded with 200 short tons (181 metric tons/tonnes) of stone, was scuttled as a blockship about 3 nautical miles (5.6 km) southeast of Morris Island in the Main Ship Channel of Charleston Harbor off Charleston, South Carolina, as part of the "Stone Fleet" on 19 or 20 December. In little over a week the stone cargo sank deep into the mud and the rest of the ship broke up by wave action, a total failure.
Maria Theresa	United States	American Civil War, Union blockade: The 330-ton full-rigged ship, a former whaler loaded with 320 short tons (290 metric tons/tonnes) of stone, was scuttled as a blockship southeast of Morris Island in the Main Ship Channel of Charleston Harbor off Charleston, South Carolina, as part of the "Stone Fleet" on 19 or 20 December. In little over a week the stone cargo sank deep into the mud and the rest of the ship broke up by wave action, a total failure.
Morrisons	United Kingdom	The ship was driven ashore and wrecked at Blakeney, Norfolk. She was on a voyage from Sunderland, County Durham to Alexandria, Egypt.
Potomac	United States	American Civil War, Union blockade: The 350- or 356-ton full-rigged ship, a former whaler loaded with 350 short tons (318 metric tons/tonnes) of stone, was scuttled as a blockship in the Main Ship Channel of Charleston Harbor off Charleston, South Carolina, as part of the "Stone Fleet" on 19 or 20 December. In little over a week the stone cargo sank deep into the mud and the rest of the ship broke up by wave action, a total failure.
USS Rebecca Sims	United States Navy	American Civil War, Union blockade: The 400-ton full-rigged ship, a former whaler also referred to as USS Rebecca Simms and USS Rebecca Ann loaded with 425 short tons (386 metric tons/tonnes) of stone, was scuttled as a blockship in the Main Ship Channel of Charleston Harbor off Charleston, South Carolina, as part of the "Stone Fleet" on 19 or 20 December. In little over a week the stone cargo sank deep into the mud and the rest of the ship broke up by wave action, a total failure.
Robin Hood	United States	American Civil War, Union blockade: The 395- or 400-ton full-rigged ship was scuttled, by burning, as a blockship in the Main Ship Channel of Charleston Harbor off Charleston, South Carolina, as part of the "Stone Fleet" on 19 or 20 December. In little over a week the stone cargo sank deep into the mud and the rest of the ship broke up by wave action, a total failure.
Sancho Panza	United Kingdom	The ship ran aground at Poole, Dorset. She was on a voyage from Seaham, county Durham to Poole. She was refloated but found to be severely leaky.
William Lee	United States	American Civil War, Union blockade: The 311-ton full-rigged ship, a former whaler, was scuttled as a blockship in the Main Ship Channel of Charleston Harbor off Charleston, South Carolina, as part of the "Stone Fleet" on 19 or 20 December. In little over a week the stone cargo sank deep into the mud and the rest of the ship broke up by wave action, a total failure.

== 20 December ==
List of shipwrecks: 20 December 1861
Ship	State	Description
Addison	United Kingdom	The ship was driven ashore at Cape Cod, Massachusetts, United States. She was on a voyage from Liverpool, Lancashire to Boston, Massachusetts. She was refloated.
HMRC Badger	Board of Customs	The cutter was run down and sunk off Kingstown, County Dublin by the steamship Leda (United Kingdom). Her crew were rescued by Leda.
Magnus Trail	United Kingdom	The schooner struck the Great Russell Rocks, in the Channel Islands and foundered with the loss of all hands. She was on a voyage from Newcastle upon Tyne, Northumberland to Guernsey, Channel Islands.
USS Tenedos	United States Navy	American Civil War, Union blockade: The 245- or 300-ton barque, a former merchant ship, was scuttled as a blockship in the Main Ship Channel of Charleston Harbor off Charleston, South Carolina, as part of the "Stone Fleet."

== 21 December ==
List of shipwrecks: 21 December 1861
Ship	State	Description
Alice Smith	(United Kingdom of Great Britain and Ireland) Cape Colony	The schooner was wrecked at Port St. Johns. All on board survived.
Cornelius Peters	United Kingdom	The brig ran aground on the Sunk Sand, in the North Sea off the coast of Essex. She was on a voyage from Newcastle upon Tyne, Northumberland to Lisbon, Portugal. She was refloated and taken in to Colchester, Essex.
Great Britain	United Kingdom	The ship was driven ashore on Anticosti Island, Nova Scotia, British North America.
Northumberland	United Kingdom	The steamship collided with the brig Alpha and ran aground on the Herd Sand, in the North Sea off the coast of County Durham. She was on a voyage from London to North Shields, Northumberland. She was refloated and towed in to North Shields.
Two unidentified flatboats	Confederate States of America	American Civil War, Union blockade: The flatboats were captured and destroyed on the Rappahannock River in Virginia by the armed sidewheel paddle steamer USS Coeur de Lion (United States Navy).

== 22 December ==
List of shipwrecks: 22 December 1861
Ship	State	Description
HMS Devastation	Royal Navy	The Driver-class sloop ran aground off Shoeburyness, Essex. Subsequently refloated, repaired and returned to service.
Mary Willis	Confederate States of America	American Civil War, Union blockade: Holed below the waterline by Union artillery fire during a voyage with a cargo of wood, the schooner was run aground on the mudflats at Boyd's Hole on the Virginia shore of the Potomac River.

== 23 December ==
List of shipwrecks: 23 December 1861
Ship	State	Description
Good Intent	United Kingdom	The ship struck the Crun Rocks, in the Isles of Scilly and foundered. Her crew were rescued. She was on a voyage from Llanelly, Glamorgan to Caen, Calvados, France.
Nugget	United Kingdom	The ship was sighted whilst on a voyage from Calcutta, India to London. No further trace, presumed foundered with the loss of all hands.
Sea Lion	United Kingdom	The ship was loat off Cape Ray, Newfoundland, British North America.
Uncle Billy	United Kingdom	The ship struck a sunken rock in the Antwerp Passage, off the mouth of the Charente. She was on a voyage from Rochefort, Charente-Inférieure to London. She put in to Plymouth, Devon in a severely leaky condition on 27 December.

== 24 December ==
List of shipwrecks: 24 December 1861
Ship	State	Description
Ann	United Kingdom	The brig sank off Spurn Point, Yorkshire. Her crew survived. She was on a voyage from Seaham, County Durham to Rochester, Kent.
Cleaver	United Kingdom	The ship ran aground at Sunderland, County Durham. She was on a voyage from Dieppe, Seine-Inférieure, France to Sunderland. She was refloated with the assistance of a tug.
Cornelis Pieter	United Kingdom	The brig ran aground on the Sunk Sand, in the North Sea off the coast of Essex. She was on a voyage from Newcastle upon Tyne, Northumberland to Lisbon, Portugal. She was refloated with assistance from the smack Increase and taken in to Wivenhoe, Essex.
Prince of Wales	United Kingdom	American Civil War, Union blockade: The schooner, a blockade runner with a cargo of salt, fruit, and sundries, was set afire by her crew at the north end of North Island off Georgetown, South Carolina. Boats from the barque USS Gem of the Sea and the armed sidewheel paddle steamer USS James Adger (both United States Navy) captured her, but the boat crews burned her when Confederate rifle fire drove them off.
R. H. Oakes	United States	The schooner went ashore on the Bar at Louisbourg, Nova Scotia and became a total wreck. Crew saved.
Sir William Wallace	United Kingdom	The paddle tug caught fire and sank at North Shields, Northumberland.
Sparkling Foam	United Kingdom	The schooner was wrecked on the Margate Sands. She was on a voyage from London to Berbice, British Guiana.
Tordenskjold	Norway	The ship was driven ashore at Trondheim. She was on a voyage from Newcastle upon Tyne to Trondheim. She was refloated.

== 25 December ==
List of shipwrecks: 25 December 1861
Ship	State	Description
Ebenezer	United Kingdom	The ship was driven ashore at Fraserburgh, Aberdeenshire. She was on a voyage from Sunderland, County Durham to Bonar Bridge, Sutherland.
Grace	United Kingdom	The barque was abandoned in the Atlantic Ocean, being in a sinking condition. Her crew were rescued by Statesman (United Kingdom). Grace was on a voyage from New York, United States to Belfast, County Antrim.
Kenmore	United Kingdom	The ship was abandoned in the Atlantic Ocean. Her crew were rescued by Lucy Ring (United Kingdom). Kenmore was on a voyage from New York to Queenstown, County Cork.
Princess Royal	United Kingdom	The brig was wrecked at "Ichelengo", Ottoman Empire. Her crew were rescued. She was on a voyage from Odesa to a British port.

== 26 December ==
List of shipwrecks: 26 December 1861
Ship	State	Description
Annie Buckham	United States	The barque was abandoned in the Atlantic Ocean. Her thirteen crew were rescued by the barques Burgomaster (Prussia), Mercurius (Hamburg) and the brig Success (United Kingdom). Annie Buckham was on a voyage from Cardiff, Glamorgan, United Kingdom to Shanghai, China.
Englishman	United Kingdom	The ship was abandoned in the Atlantic Ocean. Her crew were rescued by Universe (United Kingdom). Englishman was on a voyage from New York, United States to Cork.
Rachel	France	The schooner collided with a Swedish barque and was abandoned off Lisbon, Portugal by seven of her eight crew. She was on a voyage from Newcastle upon Tyne, Northumberland, United Kingdom to Lisbon. The remaining crew member was taken off by the steamship Gin Kee or Jin Kee (Flag unknown) on 28 December.

== 27 December ==
List of shipwrecks: 27 December 1861
Ship	State	Description
Canrobert	United Kingdom	The barque foundered off the coast of Portugal. Her crew were rescued by Balfour (United Kingdom). Canrobert was on a voyage from South Shields, County Durham to Genoa, Italy.
Duchese	United Kingdom	The ship was abandoned in the Atlantic Ocean. Her crew were rescued by Kalos (United States). Duchese was on a voyage from New York, United States to Queenstown, County Cork.
Harriet Preston	United Kingdom	The schooner departed from Arbroath, Forfarshire for Cork. Presumed subsequently foundered in the English Channel with the loss of all hands. A boat was discovered off Torquay, Devon on 20 January 1862.
USRC Howell Cobb	United States Revenue Marine	The revenue cutter was wrecked on the coast of Massachusetts at Cape Ann during a gale. Her crew was rescued by the revenue cutter USRC Morris ( United States Revenue Marine).
Lord Elgin	United Kingdom	The ship ran aground at Demerara, British Guiana. She was on a voyage from Demerara to London. She was refloated on 29 December and put back to Demerara for repairs.
Miss Nightingale	United Kingdom	The ship ran aground at Demerara. She was on a voyage from Demerara to London. She was refloated on 29 December and put back to Demerara for repairs.
Nepaulese Ambassador	United Kingdom	The barque was wrecked at Thessaloniki, Greece with the loss of eleven of her twelve crew. She was on a voyage from Syros to Thessaloniki.
Phantom	United Kingdom	The schooner ran aground on the Mussel Scarp, on the coast of Northumberland.
Premium	United Kingdom	The schooner ran aground on the Mussel Scarp.
Rousseau	France	The ship ran aground at Demerara. She was on a voyage from Demerara to London. She was refloated on 29 December and put back to Demerara for repairs.
Sappho	United Kingdom	The brig was wrecked near Safi, Morocco. Her crew were rescued.
Standard	United Kingdom	The steamship collided with the steamship Crimean (United Kingdom) and sank at Waterloo, Lancashire. She was on a voyage from Liverpool, Lancashire to Dublin. She was refloated on 31 December, but had to be scuttled.
Trojan	United Kingdom	The ship ran aground at Demerara. She was on a voyage from Demerara to the Clyde.

== 28 December ==
List of shipwrecks: 28 December 1861
Ship	State	Description
Ebenezer	United Kingdom	The ship foundered off the Longships Lighthouse, Cornwall. Her crew were rescued. She was on a voyage from Penzance, Cornwall to Newport, Monmouthshire.
Mary and Isabella	United Kingdom	The brig was abandoned in the Atlantic Ocean. Her crew were rescued by Lammergeier (Flag unknown). Mary and Isabella was on a voyage from New York, United States to Queenstown, County Cork.
Nancy	United Kingdom	The ship was driven ashore and wrecked at Tramore, County Waterford. She was on a voyage from Dunkirk, Nord to Liverpool, Lancashire.
Pharamond	France	The brig foundered in the Atlantic Ocean 60 nautical miles (110 km) off Cape Finisterre, Spain. Her crew were rescued She was on a voyage from Newport, Monmouthshire, United Kingdom to Santos, Brazil.
Vincent	Sweden	The brig was driven ashore at St. Anne's Bay, Jamaica.

== 29 December ==
List of shipwrecks: 29 December 1861
Ship	State	Description
HMS Conqueror	Royal Navy	The wreck of HMS Conqueror, depicted in a 19th-century engraving attributed to George Pechell Mends. The first-rate screw ship-of-the-line was wrecked on Rum Cay in the Bahamas due to a navigational error. All 1,400 people on board survived.
Grosse Fürstinn Catherina	Grand Duchy of Mecklenburg-Schwerin	The barque was wrecked at Gibraltar. Her crew were rescued by HMS Lapwing (Royal Navy). Grosse Fürstinn Catherina was on a voyage from Trieste to Havre de Grâce, Seine-Inférieure, France.
Ionia	United Kingdom	The steamship was damaged by fire at Liverpool, Lancashire.
Lavinia	United Kingdom	The brig was severely damaged by fire at Newport, Monmouthshire.

== 30 December ==
List of shipwrecks: 30 December 1861
Ship	State	Description
Columbine	United Kingdom	The ship was abandoned in the Atlantic Ocean. Her crew were rescued by the full-rigged ship Ellen Stewart (United States). Columbine was on a voyage from New York, United States to Queenstown, County Cork
Maria	United Kingdom	The ship ran aground on the Burbo Bank, in Liverpool Bay and sank. Her crew were rescued by the tug Voltigeur (United Kingdom). Maria was on a voyage from Cork to Liverpool, Lancashire.
Maria	Grand Duchy of Oldenburg	The ship was wrecked at Brindisi, Italy. She was on a voyage from Cardiff, Glamorgan, United Kingdom to Trieste.
Standard	United Kingdom	The ship was sighted in the Atlantic Ocean whilst on a voyage from Alexandria, Egypt to South Shields, County Durham. No further trace, presumed foundered with the loss of all hands.

== 31 December ==
List of shipwrecks: 31 December 1861
Ship	State	Description
Mary Ann	Prussia	The ship was wrecked at Frederikshavn, Denmark with the loss of all but two of her crew. She was on a voyage from Memel to London, United Kingdom.
Unidentified gunboat	Confederate States Navy	American Civil War, Union blockade: The gunboat, a former lightvessel, was destroyed in the Atlantic Ocean off Wilmington, North Carolina, by boat crews from the armed screw steamer USS Mount Vernon (United States Navy).

== Unknown date ==
List of shipwrecks: Unknown date December 1861
Ship	State	Description
Amor Paterno	Italy	The brig was wrecked at "Kile", Ottoman Empire. She was on a voyage from Azoff, Russia to a Mediterranean port.
Bianca	United States	Carrying a cargo of wood, the schooner ran aground on the coast of California at Salt Point.
Bondicar	United Kingdom	The ship was wrecked at Odesa after 6 December.
Champion	United Kingdom	The ship was driven ashore on Georges Island, Massachusetts, United States. She was on a voyage from New York to London. She was refloated on 12 December and resumed her voyage.
Coquette	United Kingdom	The ship was wrecked at Gallipoli, Ottoman Empire before 24 December. Her crew were rescued.
Coronel	Chile	The barque was abandoned in the Pacific Ocean. She was on a voyage from San Francisco, California to Valparaíso.
Cynisca	United States	The schooner left Gloucester, Massachusetts 13 December 1861 and vanished. Probably lost in the 1 January gale. lost with all 9 hands.
Doctor Bunting	United Kingdom	The ship was driven ashore at the mouth of the Maareanga River.
Dragon	United Kingdom	The steamship struck a sunken wreck off the Isles of Scilly and was holed. She arrived in the River Mersey on 25 December in a waterlogged condition.
Earl of Hardwicke	(United Kingdom of Great Britain and Ireland) Hong Kong	The brig was driven ashore at Adelaide, South Australia between 14 and 16 December. She was on a voyage from Hong Kong to Adelaide and Melbourne, Victoria.
Ella Osborne	United States	The schooner went ashore at Cole Bay and became a total wreck. Crew saved.
Empress	United Kingdom	The abandoned brig was taken in to Stromstad, Norway in a waterlogged condition.
Fanny	United Kingdom	The ship was wrecked near Sinope, Ottoman Empire with the loss of all hands. She was on a voyage from Berdyansk, Russia to an English port.
Firefly	(United Kingdom of Great Britain and Ireland) South Australia	The ship was driven ashore at Adelaide between 14 and 16 December.
Glencoe	United Kingdom	The ship was wrecked at Odesa after 6 December.
Hellespont	United Kingdom	The ship ran aground on the Barque Flats, off the coast of Burma and was damaged. She was on a voyage from Madras, India to Rangoon, Burma. She was refloated and completed her voyage.
Huon	(United Kingdom of Great Britain and Ireland) New Zealand	The schooner was wrecked on a sandbar at the mouth of the Taieri River, New Zealand, sometime prior to 14 December.
Jenny	United Kingdom	The ship was abandoned in the Atlantic Ocean before 26 December.
John Russell	United Kingdom	The steamship was driven ashore on the coast of New Jersey, United States before 3 December. She was on a voyage from London to New York.
USS Lewis	United States Navy	American Civil War, Union blockade: The full-rigged ship, a former whaler slated for use as a blockship in the "Stone Fleet," ran aground and broke open her bilge near Tybee Island, Georgia.
Lifeboat	United States	The schooner left Gloucester, Massachusetts 27 December 1861 and vanished. Probably lost in the 1 January gale. Lost with all 9 hands.
Magna Charta	United Kingdom	The ship was driven ashore at St. Stefano Point, Ottoman Empire before 27 December. She was on a voyage from Constantinople to a European port. She was refloated and put back to Constantinople.
Majestic	United Kingdom	The ship was abandoned. She was on a voyage from London to New York.
Marianne	France	The schooner foundered in the Atlantic Ocean before 17 December. Seven crew were rescued by Jezeline (Portugal).
USS Maria Theresa	United States Navy	American Civil War, Union blockade: The ship was scuttled as a blockship in Charleston Harbor off Charleston, South Carolina, about four miles south-southeast of Fort Sumter and three miles east-southeast of the lighthouse on Morris Island as part of the "Stone Fleet."
Marmion	United Kingdom	The ship was wrecked at "Carabournon", Ottoman Empire with the loss of all hands. She was on a voyage from Odesa to an English port.
Mary Miller	United Kingdom	The barque departed from Agrigento, Sicily, Italy in early December. No further trace, presumed foundered with the loss of all hands.
Medium	United Kingdom	The ship was wrecked at Odesa after 6 December.
Nueva Serafin	Spain	The brig was abandoned in the Atlantic Ocean. Her crew were rescued by Valentia (United Kingdom). Nueva Serafin was on a voyage from Swansea, Glamorgan, United Kingdom to Bordeaux, Gironde, France.
Ocean	United Kingdom	The ship was abandoned in the Atlantic Ocean. Her crew were rescued. She was on a voyage from South Shields, County Durham to Cork.
Ocean Child	United Kingdom	The ship was wrecked on the Swedish coast.
Ocean Express	United States	The clipper ran aground off New York. She was refloated.
Onda	United Kingdom	The steamship was wrecked on Anholt, Denmark. She was on a voyage from Kronstadt, Russia to London.
Oprichnik (Опричник)	Imperial Russian Navy	The Razboinik-class frigate departed from Batavia, Dutch East Indies for Kronstadt on 10 December. Seen by Laplace (French Navy) on 12 December at approx. 7°58′S 103°40′E. Possibly sighted by Zwaan (Netherlands) on 25 December in the Indian Ocean at approx. 22°08′S 68°23′E. No further trace, presumed foundered with the loss of all 94 or 95 crew.
Oriental Queen	Sweden	The ship was wrecked on the Nantucket South Shoal, off the coast of Massachusetts, United States. Her crew were rescued. She was on a voyage from New York to Cork.
Paxton	United Kingdom	The ship was driven ashore on Blessing Island.
Pedro	Chile	The brig was lost at "Pichendaguai".
Pizarro	Confederate States of America	The 419-bulk-ton steamer vanished after departing New Orleans, Louisiana, on 11 December. She probably foundered in a storm in the Gulf of Mexico.
Poserdon	Kingdom of Hanover	The ship was damaged by ice in Riga Bay. She was on a voyage from Riga, Russia to an English port. She put in to Helsingør, Denmark on 15 December in a severely leaky condition.
USS Robin Hood	United States Navy	American Civil War, Union blockade: The former East Indiaman was scuttled as a blockship in the main channel of Charleston Harbor off Charleston, South Carolina, as part of the "Stone Fleet."
Scandinavian	Sweden	The ship was presumed to have foundered with the loss of all hands before 15 December. She was on a voyage from Aarhus, Denmark to Stockholm. Wreckage from the ship came ashore at Turku, Grand Duchy of Finland.
Sea Queen	United Kingdom	The schooner was wrecked at Rhosnagyn, Caernarfonshire.
Skandinavian	Sweden	The ship foundered in the Baltic Sea before 15 December with the loss of all hands. She was on a voyage from "Ahns" to Stockholm.
Starlight	(United Kingdom of Great Britain and Ireland) South Australia	The ship was driven ashore at Adelaide between 14 and 16 December. She was refloated two days later.
Thomas Sparks	United Kingdom	The full-rigged ship was wrecked on the Indian coast. She was on a voyage from Calcutta, India to London.
Waterloo	United Kingdom	The ship was wrecked at Odesa after 6 December.
