= List of shipwrecks in January 1862 =

The list of shipwrecks in January 1862 includes ships sunk, foundered, grounded, or otherwise lost during January 1862.

== 1 January ==
List of shipwrecks: 1 January 1862
Ship	State	Description
Advocate	Confederate States of America	American Civil War, Union blockade: The fishing schooner was scuttled as a blockship by Union forces in the Petit Bois Channel on the coast of Mississippi. She had been captured by the screw steamer USS New London (United States Navy) on 1 December 1861.
Alice Jane	United Kingdom	The ship was wrecked on the Whitton Sand, in the Humber with the loss of all five people on board. She was on a voyage from Great Grimsby to Gainsborough, Lincolnshire.
Granite State	United States	The full-rigged ship ran aground in the Hooghly River. She was on a voyage from Calcutta, India to London, United Kingdom. She was refloated and resumed her voyage.
Hunter	United Kingdom	The ship was abandoned off Saint John's, Newfoundland, British North America.
Ocean Traveller	United States	The fishing schooner sank in a gale on a trip from Gloucester, Massachusetts to Newfoundland. Lost with all 10 crew.
Prinz Regent	Prussia	The schooner was damaged by fire at Liverpool, Lancashire, United Kingdom.
Thomas Ann Cole	United Kingdom	The ship was abandoned in the Atlantic Ocean. Her crew were rescued by Cyguena (France). Thomas Ann Cole was on a voyage from New York, United States to London.

== 2 January ==
List of shipwrecks: 2 January 1862
Ship	State	Description
Belle Creole	United States	The ship was driven ashore at Newport, Rhode Island. She was on a voyage from London, United Kingdom to New York
Courier	Prussia	The barque was driven ashore near Odesa.
Glentanner	United Kingdom	The full-rigged ship struck the Rocas reef off the north-eastern Brazilian coast and foundered. The crew took to the boats. One group of nine crew reached Pernambuco; the captain and eight others were rescued on 5 January by the ship Arey (United States) and brought to Berehaven, County Cork. Glentanner was on a voyage from Callao, Peru to Queenstown, County Cork, for orders, with guano.
Lady Flora Hastings	United Kingdom	The ship was abandoned in the Indian Ocean. She was on a voyage from Moulmein, Burma to a British port.
Northern Light	United States	The clipper collided with the brig Nouveau St. Jacques (France) and was consequently abandoned at sea. All on board were rescued by Bremenhaven (Bremen) and Norma (Norway). She was on a voyage from Havre de Grâce, Seine-Inférieure, France to New York.
Nouveau St. Jacques	France	The brig sank after colliding with the clipper Northern Light (United States). Her crew were rescued by Northern Light.
Orient	United Kingdom	The full-rigged ship caught fire in the Atlantic Ocean. She was on a voyage from Adelaide, South Australia to London. Female passengers were taken off the next day by the barque Commissaris der Konings (Netherlands). Orient put in to Ascension Island on 5 January in a severely damaged condition.
Uranus	Flag unknown	The ship departed from Newcastle upon Tyne, Northumberland, United Kingdom for Galați, Ottoman Empire. No further trace, presumed foundered with the loss of all hands.

== 3 January ==
List of shipwrecks: 3 January 1862
Ship	State	Description
Anna and Olga	Russia	The ship was driven ashore near Bolderāja. She was on a voyage from Riga to London, United Kingdom.
Diana	United Kingdom	The full-rigged ship ran aground on the Goodwin Sands, Kent. She was refloated with the assistance of a Broadstairs lugger.
Diligence	United Kingdom	The ship ran aground at Lowestoft, Suffolk. She was refloated the next day and taken in to port.
Elvina	United Kingdom	The ship ran aground on the Goodwin Sands. She was on a voyage from South Shields, County Durham to Alicante, Spain. She was refloated with assistance from a Broadstairs lugger.
Euphrosyne	United Kingdom	The barque was destroyed by fire in the Atlantic Ocean 40 nautical miles (74 km) west of Porto Santo Island. Her crew were rescued. She was on a voyage from Newport, Monmouthshire to Fernando Po, Spanish Guinea.
Maria	United Kingdom	The ship was destroyed by fire at Macao, China.
Middlesex	United Kingdom	The ship departed from Cardiff, Glamorgan for Jamaica. No further trace, presumed foundered with the loss of all hands.
Wild Ranger	United States	The clipper collided with Coleroon (United Kingdom) and was damaged. Wild Ranger was on a voyage from London to Boston, Massachusetts. She put in to Falmouth, Cornwall, United Kingdom.
Zephias	United Kingdom	The brig was driven ashore and wrecked at Cape Hatteras, North Carolina, Confederate States of America. Her crew were rescued. She was on a voyage from Cardenas, Cuba to New York, United States.

== 4 January ==
List of shipwrecks: 4 January 1862
Ship	State	Description
Adonis	United Kingdom	The steamship ran aground on the Mugglin Rocks off the coast of County Dublin and consequently sank 6 nautical miles (11 km) off Bray Head, County Wicklow. Her six passengers and twenty crew reached land in the ship's boats. She was on a voyage from Belfast, County Antrim to Waterford, Plymouth, Devon and London.
Ann Percival	United Kingdom	The barque was abandoned in the Atlantic Ocean. Her crew were rescued by the steamship Seine (France). Ann Percival was on a voyage from Demerara to Pembroke.
Belisario	(United Kingdom of Great Britain and Ireland) Gibraltar	The schooner was wrecked at Conil de la Frontera, Spain. Her crew were rescued. She was on a voyage from Livorno, Italy to Cádiz, Spain.
Santi-Pietri	France	Santi-Pietri. The prison hulk, a former ship-of-the-line, was destroyed by fire at Toulon, Var.
Edward Everett	United States	The full-rigged ship was driven ashore on the Belgian-French border. Some of her crew were rescued by a tug, the rest too to a boat; they were reported missing. She was on a voyage from Amsterdam, North Holland, Netherlands to Baltimore, Maryland. She was refloated on 18 February.
Gloria	Russia	The ship was driven ashore at Helsingør, Denmark. She was on a voyage from Liepāja to Hull, Yorkshire, United Kingdom. She was refloated and taken in to Helsingør in a severely leaky condition.
Mary Ann	United Kingdom	The schooner was driven ashore at Cádiz, Spain. Her crew were rescued. She was on a voyage from Swansea, Glamorgan to Palermo, Sicily, Italy.
Record	United Kingdom	The barque ran aground at St. George's, Bermuda. She was refloated the next day with the assistance of tugs.
Salacca	United Kingdom	The schooner collided with a brigantine and foundered off the Runnel Stone. She was on a voyage from Portsmouth, Hampshire to Llanelly, Glamorgan.
Samuel Killam	United States	The brig was abandoned in the Atlantic Ocean. Her crew were rescued by W. Padmore (United States). Samuel Killam was on a voyage from New York to Queenstown, County Cork, United Kingdom.
No. 25	United Kingdom	The pilot boat was abandoned in the Bristol Channel. Her crew survived. She subsequently came ashore at Combe Martin, Devon.

== 5 January ==
List of shipwrecks: 5 January 1862
Ship	State	Description
Benlomond	United Kingdom	The full-rigged ship was wrecked on the Canadian coast.
Bouchma	Danzig	The ship struck a sunken wreck on the Kosbergrund and was damaged. She was on a voyage from Danzig to Grangemouth, Stirlingshire, United Kingdom. She put in to Helsingør, Denmark in a leaky condition.
Content	United Kingdom	The brig ran aground on the Cockle Sand, in the North Sea off the coast of Norfolk. She was on a voyage from Hartlepool, County Durham to Dieppe, Seine-Inférieure, France. She was refloated and resumed her voyage.
Dr. Bunting	United Kingdom	The barque was wrecked on the Canadian coast. Her crew survived.
Evergreen	United Kingdom	The barque was wrecked on the Canadian coast. Her crew survived.
John and Elizabeth	United Kingdom	The ship ran aground on the Newcombe Sand, in the North Sea off the coast of Suffolk. She was on a voyage from Methil, Fife to London. She was refloated and assisted in to Harwich, Essex in a severely leaky condition.
John Pink	United Kingdom	The ship was wrecked on the Canadian coast.
La Canadienne	United Kingdom	The survey ship was wrecked on the Canadian coast.
Rebecca Jane	United Kingdom	The ship ran aground on the Barnard Sand, in the North Sea off the coast of Suffolk. She was on a voyage from London to South Shields, County Durham. She was refloated and towed in to Lowestoft, Suffolk in a severely leaky condition.
Scotia	United Kingdom	The ship was wrecked on the Barber Sand, in the North Sea off the coast of Norfolk. Her crew were rescued. She was on a voyage from Sunderland, County Durham to London.
Signet	United Kingdom	The barque was wrecked on the Canadian coast.
Sutlej	United Kingdom	The ship was wrecked on the Canadian coast. Her crew survived. She was on a voyage from Montreal, Province of Canada, British North America to Liverpool, Lancashire.
W. Padmore	United States	The ship was abandoned in the Atlantic Ocean. All on board were rescued by the steamship Merlin (United Kingdom). W. Padmore was on a voyage from New York to Livorno, Italy.

== 6 January ==
List of shipwrecks: 6 January 1862
Ship	State	Description
Eliza Laing	United Kingdom	The ship was abandoned in the Atlantic Ocean. Her crew were rescued by Colin Campbell (United Kingdom). Eliza Laing was on a voyage from New York to Queenstown, County Cork.

== 7 January ==
List of shipwrecks: 7 January 1862
Ship	State	Description
Albion	United Kingdom	The schooner was destroyed by fire at Scarborough, Yorkshire. The one person on board was rescued.
Isabel	United Kingdom	The ship departed from New York, United States for Liverpool, Lancashire. No further trace, presumed foundered with the loss of all hands.
Julie and August	Grand Duchy of Mecklenburg-Schwerin	The brig ran aground on the Osterlief, in the Baltic Sea. She had been refloated by 13 January.
Marcia	United States	American Civil War, Union blockade: Intended for scuttling as a blockship in Charleston Harbor off Charleston, South Carolina, as part of the "Stone Fleet", the 343-ton bark, a former merchant ship, struck bottom and sank while crossing Port Royal Bar near Port Royal, South Carolina.
True Briton	United Kingdom	The tug caught fire in the River Thames at Rotherhithe, Surrey and was scuttled.
Unidentified vessels	Confederate States of America	American Civil War: The vessels, at least some of them barges, were burned in the Pamunkey River in Virginia near West Point and White House.

== 8 January ==
List of shipwrecks: 8 January 1862
Ship	State	Description
John Fenwick	United Kingdom	The steamship was driven ashore at Blakeney, Norfolk. She was on a voyage from North Shields, Northumberland to London. She was refloated and resumed her voyage.
Snake	United Kingdom	The smack foundered off Ballywalter, County Down. Her crew were rescued. She was on a voyage from Dartmouth, Devon to Crinan, Argyllshire.

== 9 January ==
List of shipwrecks: 9 January 1862
Ship	State	Description
Appleton	United Kingdom	The full-rigged ship foundered off Mauritius. Her crew were rescued by Tivoli (United Kingdom). Appleton was on a voyage from London to Colombo, Ceylon.
Australia	United Kingdom	The ship ran aground in the Hooghly River. She was on a voyage from Calcutta, India to Akyab, Burma. She was refloated and resumed her voyage.
Eleanore	Sweden	The brig ran aground near "Marsland". She was refloated on 11 January and found to be leaky.
Harriet Cann	United Kingdom	The barque was wrecked on the Skerweather Sands, in the Bristol Channel off the coast of Glamorgan. She was on a voyage from New York, United States to Gloucester. She floated off and came ashore at Southerndown, Glamorgan on fire.
USS Meteor	United States Navy	American Civil War, Union blockade: The full-rigged ship, a former whaler, was scuttled in Charleston Harbor off Charleston, South Carolina, Confederate States of America, as part of the "Stone Fleet".
Petit Pierre	France	The fishing smack was run into by an Austrian barque and sank in the English Channel off Shoreham-by-Sea, Sussex, United Kingdom. Her crew were rescued.
USS Potomac	United States Navy	American Civil War: Union blockade: The former whaler was scuttled in Charleston Harbor, as part of the "Stone Fleet".
Waverley	United States	The barque was abandoned in the Indian Ocean (19°31′S 78°10′E). Her thirteen crew were rescued by Minniehaha (United Kingdom). Waverley was on a voyage from Moulmein, Burma to Cork or Falmouth, Cornwall, United Kingdom.
Zar David	Russia	The ship was wrecked at Yevpatoria with the loss of four of her crew.
Zobia	United Kingdom	The schooner was driven ashore at Newbiggin-by-the-Sea, Northumberland. She was on a voyage from Great Yarmouth, Norfolk to South Shields, County Durham. She was refloated.

== 10 January ==
List of shipwrecks: 10 January 1862
Ship	State	Description
China	United Kingdom	The brig was wrecked near the entrance to Dardanelles. Her crew were rescued. She was on a voyage from Marseille, Bouches-du-Rhône, France to Enos, Ottoman Empire.
Cresswell Packet	United Kingdom	The schooner was wrecked on the Gaa Sands, in the North Sea off the mouth of the River Tay. Her three crew were rescued the next day by the fishing boat Jane (United Kingdom).
Earl of Hardwicke	United Kingdom	The ship was wrecked on the Pocklington Reef. She was on a voyage from Newcastle upon Tyne, Northumberland to Hong Kong.
Experiment	United Kingdom	The brig was driven ashore and wrecked at Low Hauxley, Northumberland. She was on a voyage from Sunderland, County Durham to Aberdeen.

== 11 January ==
List of shipwrecks: 11 January 1862
Ship	State	Description
Dollard	Flag unknown	The ship was wrecked on the Riel Rocks, on the coast of Cornwall, United Kingdom with the loss of thirteen of the seventeen people on board. She was on a voyage from Trieste to Falmouth, Cornwall.
Druid	United Kingdom	The barque was driven ashore at Eastbourne, Sussex. She was on a voyage from Sunderland, County Durham to Naples, Italy. Her nine crew were rescued the next day by the Eastbourne Lifeboat. She was refloated on 14 January with assistance from the tug Victoria (United Kingdom) and towed in to Newhaven, Sussex.
Janet Kidston	United Kingdom	The ship ran aground in Batten Bay. She was on a voyage from New York, United States to Plymouth, Devon. She was refloated.
Mathews and Ann	United Kingdom	The brig ran aground on the Cutler Sand, in the North Sea off the coast of Essex. She was on a voyage from Sunderland to London. She was refloated and assisted in to Harwich, Essex in a severely leaky condition.
Mooltan	United Kingdom	The steamship ran aground at Yarmouth, Isle of Wight. She was on a voyage from Bombay, India to Southampton, Hampshire. She was refloated and taken in to Southampton.
Ranger	Confederate States of America	American Civil War: The ship was captured and destroyed by USS Minnesota (United States Navy.
HMS St Vincent	Royal Navy	The Nelson-class ship of the line was driven ashore at Portsmouth, Hampshire. She was refloated.
Vesta	Confederate States of America	American Civil War: The ship was captured and destroyed by USS Minnesota (United States Navy.

== 12 January ==
List of shipwrecks: 12 January 1862
Ship	State	Description
Cromwell	United Kingdom	The Mersey Flat sank in the River Mersey at Liverpool, Lancashire. Her crew were rescued.
George C. Ross	United States	During a voyage from Port-au-Prince, Haiti, to New York with a cargo of coffee, honey, and logwood, the brig was wrecked on Long Cay in the Bahamas. Her crew were rescued.
Giaour	United Kingdom	The brig was driven ashore and damaged in the Dardanelles. She was on a voyage from Liverpool to Constantinople, Ottoman Empire. She was later refloated and resumed her voyage, arriving at Constantinople on 18 January.
Ina	United Kingdom	The brig was wrecked on the Real de las Catalanca Reef. Her crew were rescued. She was on a voyage from New York, United States to Nuevitas, Cuba.
John	United Kingdom	The Mersey Flat sank in the River Mersey at Liverpool. Her crew were rescued.
Lauriston	United Kingdom	The ship collided with Premier (United Kingdom) and was abandoned in the Atlantic Ocean. Her crew were rescued by Premier. Lauriston was on a voyage from New York, United States to Queenstown, County Cork.
Little Ben	United Kingdom	The ship was driven ashore and wrecked at Whitby, Yorkshire.
Pelikaan	Netherlands	The schooner was abandoned in the English Channel. Her crew were rescued by Eliza Jane (United Kingdom).
Salem	United Kingdom	The ship was abandoned in the English Channel off the coast of Devon with the loss of six of her 27 crew. Survivors were rescued hy Catharina (Hamburg). Salem was on a voyage from Moulmein, Burma to Falmouth, Cornwall.
Sir J. Campbell	United Kingdom	The ship was wrecked on Silver Key. She was on a voyage from Newfoundland, British North America to Havana, Cuba.
Star	United Kingdom	The ship was driven ashore at Puntales, Spain. She was on a voyage from Ardrossan, Ayrshire to Seville, Spain. She was refloated and taken in to Cádiz in a severely leaky condition.
Thomas Fielden	United Kingdom	The ship ran aground on the Owers Sandbank, in the English Channel off the coast of Sussex. Refloated in a sinking condition, she was towed in to Portsmouth, Hampshire by HMRC Argus ( Board of Customs)) and beached there. Thomas Fielden was on a voyage from Sunderland, County Durham to Bordeaux, Gironde, France.
William	United Kingdom	The Mersey Flat sank in the River Mersey at Liverpool. Her crew were rescued.

== 13 January ==
List of shipwrecks: 13 January 1862
Ship	State	Description
City of New York	United States	American Civil War: Carrying a cargo of tents and ordnance, including gunpowder, rifle muskets, artillery shells, and hand grenades, the 574-ton screw steamer was wrecked on the coast of North Carolina, Confederate States of America at Hatteras Inlet. Her entire crew was saved after hanging onto her rigging for 42 hours.
Trebiskin	United Kingdom	The ship was driven ashore at Breaksea Point, Glamorgan. She was on a voyage from Padstow, Cornwall to Cardiff, Glamorgan.
Trois Frères	France	The ship was wrecked at Guernsey, Channel Islands.

== 14 January ==
List of shipwrecks: 14 January 1862
Ship	State	Description
Edwin	United Kingdom	American Civil War: The Confederate-owned schooner was run ashore in Chesapeake Bay. Her cargo was landed and she was set afire. She was supposedly on a voyage from Baltimore, Maryland, United States to Barbados.
Louisiana	United States Army	American Civil War: The steamer ran aground on the Hatteras Inlet Bar, off the coast of North Carolina, Confederate States of America. She was refloated.
Skandinavian	United Kingdom	The barque foundered in the Atlantic Ocean 50 nautical miles (93 km) west of Gibraltar. Her crew survived. She was on a voyage from London, United Kingdom to Rio de Janeiro, Brazil.

== 15 January ==
List of shipwrecks: 15 January 1862
Ship	State	Description
Beaver	United Kingdom	The ship ran aground at Galway. She was refloated.
George Marshall	United Kingdom	The ship struck the Beagle Reef, in the Bass Strait and was consequently beached on Flinders Island, Tasmania. All on board were rescued. She was on a voyage from London to Sydney, New South Wales.
Nugget	United Kingdom	The ship departed from Calcutta, India for London. No further trace, presumed foundered with the loss of all hands.
Standard	United Kingdom	The ship ran aground in the Belfast Lough. She was on a voyage from Belfast, County Antrim to Glasgow, Renfrewshire. She was refloated and taken under tow for Liverpool, Lancashire.

== 16 January ==
List of shipwrecks: 16 January 1862
Ship	State	Description
Ancilla	Confederate States of America	American Civil War, Union blockade: The 81-ton schooner was destroyed by the gunboat USS Hatteras (United States Navy) at Cedar Key, Florida.
Anna	United Kingdom	The barque was wrecked on the Cockburn Reef. Her crew were rescued. She was on a voyage from London to the Bank's River, Brazil.
Chance	United Kingdom	The schooner ran aground on the Horse Bank, in the Irish Sea off the coast of Lancashire. She was on a voyage from Barrow-in-Furness to Liverpool, Lancashire. She was refloated with assistance from the Lytham Lifeboat.
Dromo	France	The ship was driven ashore on "Bliss Island", Maine, United States. She was on a voyage from New York, United States to the Bristol Channel.
Little Jenny	United Kingdom	The ship departed from São Miguel Island, Azores for London. No further trace, presumed foundered with the loss of all hands.
Matanzas	United Kingdom	The ship was wrecked at Laguna de los Padres, Argentina. She was on a voyage from Buenos Aires, Argentina to an English port.
Rattler	Confederate States of America	American Civil War, Union blockade: The 66-ton sloop was destroyed by the gunboat USS Hatteras (United States Navy) at Cedar Key, Florida.
Rook	United Kingdom	The schooner ran aground at Dundalk, County Louth. She was refloated with assistance from the Dundalk Lifeboat and taken in to that port.
Shamrock	United Kingdom	The ship ran aground in the Belfast Lough.
Stag	Confederate States of America	American Civil War, Union blockade: The 200-ton schooner was destroyed by the gunboat USS Hatteras (United States Navy) at Cedar Key, Florida.
William	United Kingdom	The schooner ran aground and was damaged at Ilfracombe, Devon. She was on a voyage form Cardiff, Glamorgan to Hayle, Cornwall. She was refloated and taken in to Ilfracombe in a sinking condition.
William H. Middleton	Confederate States of America	American Civil War, Union blockade: The 69-ton sloop was destroyed by the gunboat USS Hatteras (United States Navy) at Cedar Key, Florida.
Wyfe	Confederate States of America	American Civil War, Union blockade: The schooner was destroyed by the gunboat USS Hatteras (United States Navy) at Cedar Key, Florida.
York	United Kingdom	American Civil War, Union blockade: Pursued by the armed screw steamer USS Albatross (United States Navy), the blockade runner ran aground on the coast of North Carolina, Confederate States of America east of Bogue Inlet. While Albatross and the barque USS Gemsbok (United States Navy) provided covering fire, boat crews from Albatross set her on fire.
Unidentified vessels	Confederate States of America	American Civil War, Union blockade: A sailboat, a launch, and a ferry scow were destroyed by the gunboat USS Hatteras (United States Navy) at Cedar Key, Florida. Three schooners carrying lumber and turpentine and five fishing smacks partially laden with goods were destroyed at Sea Horse Key and Cedar Key, either destroyed by USS Hatteras or burned by the Confederates to prevent their capture by USS Hatteras.

== 17 January ==
List of shipwrecks: 17 January 1862
Ship	State	Description
Bellona	United Kingdom	The schooner was wrecked at Dundrum, County Down with the loss of three of her four crew. Her captain was rescued by the Tyrella Lifeboat. She was on a voyage from Liverpool, Lancashire to Dundrum.
Crisis	United Kingdom	The barque was wrecked on the Arklow Bank, in the Irish Sea off the coast of County Wicklow. Eleven of her nineteen crew were reported missing. She was on a voyage from Liverpool to Singapore, Straits Settlements.
Genevieve	(United Kingdom of Great Britain and Ireland) British Mauritius	The barque went ashore close to the Otago Heads at the entrance to Otago Harbour, New Zealand. She was carrying a cargo of sugar and coffee from Mauritius. The crew were saved, but most of the cargo was lost.
Malayer	United Kingdom	The ship caught fire at Dartmouth, Devon and was scuttled. She was on a voyage from Hartlepool, County Durham to Batavia, Netherlands East Indies.

== 18 January ==
List of shipwrecks: 18 January 1862
Ship	State	Description
Boadicea	United Kingdom	The barque was destroyed by fire at Demerara, British Guiana with the loss of a crew member. Two others were severely injured.
Cadiz, Jason, and Rover	United Kingdom; France; United Kingdom)	The brigs Cadiz and Jason and the schooner Rover all collided at Swansea, Glamorgan and were all driven ashore and damaged. Cadiz was on a voyage from the Charente to Swansea. Jason was on a voyage from Cherbourg, Seine-Inférieure to Swansea. Rover was on a voyage from Fowey, Cornwall to Swansea. They were all condemned.
Jeresina Delia	United Kingdom	The ship departed from Cardiff, Glamorgan for Malta. No further trace, presumed foundered with the loss of all hands.
Matilda	United Kingdom	The barque was driven ashore on Guadeloupe. Her crew were rescued.
Neapolitan	United States	American Civil War: During a voyage from Messina, Italy, to Boston, Massachusetts, with a cargo of dried and fresh fruit and sulphur, the 322-ton barque was captured and burned in the Strait of Gibraltar within 1.5 nautical miles (2.8 km) of Ceuta by the merchant raider CSS Sumter (Confederate States Navy). Her twelve crew were rescued by the barque Investigator (United States).
Orleans	United Kingdom	The brigantine was wrecked at Youghal, County Cork with the loss of three of her seven crew. Survivors were rescued by the Coastguard using rocket apparatus. She was on a voyage from "Sidney" to Cork.
Pocahontas	United States	American Civil War: Bound for Roanoke Island, North Carolina, carrying 80 crewman and Union Army soldiers and a cargo of 113 horses, the 428-ton sidewheel paddle steamer was driven ashore by a storm on the coast of North Carolina, Confederate States of America 20 miles (32 km) north of Cape Hatteras and broke into three pieces with the loss of 90 horses.

== 19 January ==
List of shipwrecks: 19 January 1862
Ship	State	Description
A. C. Williams	Confederate States of America	American Civil War: Confederate forces scuttled the schooner as a blockship below Weir's Point off Roanoke Island, North Carolina.
Bonita	France	The schooner was wrecked in Dursey Sound. Her crew were rescued. She was on a voyage from Blyth, Northumberland to Queenstown, County Cork and Limerick, United Kingdom.
Gnat	United Kingdom	The brig was driven ashore and sank at Campbeltown, Argyllshire. She was on a voyage form Belfast, County Antrim to Ayr.
Heroine	United Kingdom	The brig ran aground on the Stoney Binks, in the North Sea off the mouth of the Humber. Her crew survived. She was on a voyage from Sunderland, County Durham to Shoreham-by-Sea, Sussex. She was refloated on 29 January and taken in to Grimsby, Lincolnshire.
Swift	United Kingdom	The ship ran aground on the Sheringham Shoal, in the North Sea off the coast of Norfolk. She was on a voyage from Newcastle upon Tyne, Northumberland to Tenerife, Canary Islands. She was later refloated and put in to Ramsgate, Kent in a leaky condition.
Unnamed	United Kingdom	The brigantine foundered in Dursey Sound, County Cork. Her crew were rescued.

== 20 January ==
List of shipwrecks: 20 January 1862
Ship	State	Description
Augusta	Denmark	The yacht ran aground on the Swinebottoms, in the Baltic Sea. She was on a voyage from an English port to Rønne.
Elba	(United Kingdom of Great Britain and Ireland) British North America	The ship was driven ashore near Newport, Rhode Island, United States. Her crew were rescued. She was on a voyage from New York, United States to Livorno, Italy.
J. W. Wilder	Confederate States of America	American Civil War, Union blockade: The schooner, a blockade runner, ran aground on the coast of Alabama about 15 miles east of Mobile and was captured by a boarding party from the screw steamer USS R. R. Cuyler, assisted by the screw steamer USS Huntsville and two cutters from the frigate USS Potomac (all United States Navy).
USS Margaret Scott	United States Navy	American Civil War, Union blockade: The barque was scuttled as a blockship in Maffit's Channel in Charleston Harbor off Charleston, South Carolina, Confederate States of America, as part of the "Stone Fleet".
Oregon	United States	The schooner was lost on Quaddy Head. Lost with all 8 hands.
Prince Alfred	United Kingdom	The barque was damaged by fire at Hartlepool, County Durham.

== 21 January ==
List of shipwrecks: 21 January 1862
Ship	State	Description
Carter	Confederate States of America	American Civil War: The schooner was scuttled as a blockship by the gunboat CSS Ellis (Confederate States Navy) in Croatan Sound off Roanoke Island, North Carolina, below Weir's Point.
Imogen	United Kingdom	The brig was attacked by three pirate boats 7 nautical miles (13 km) north east of the Ninepin Islands, China. Her crew were taken prisoner and she was set afire and destroyed. She was on a voyage from Hong Kong] to Shanghai, China.
Isabella	United Kingdom	The ship sprang a leak and sank at Lindisfarne, Northumberland. Her crew were rescued. She was on a voyage from Aberdeen to Sunderland, County Durham.
Josephine	Confederate States of America	American Civil War: The schooner was [scuttled as a blockship by Confederate forces in Croatan Sound.
Poulton	United Kingdom	The schooner was driven ashore and wrecked at the Point of Ness, in the Orkney Islands. Her crew were rescued. She was on a voyage from Sunderland to "Portsea".
Unnamed	Flag unknown	The barque was wrecked on the coast of Cornwall, United Kingdom 6 nautical miles (11 km) from The Lizard with the loss of eleven of her seventeen crew.

== 22 January ==
List of shipwrecks: 22 January 1862
Ship	State	Description
Anne McLeod	United Kingdom	The ship foundered off the coast of County Down. She was on a voyage from Dundalk, County Louth to Liverpool, Lancashire.
Arkwright	United Kingdom	The ship was driven ashore 5 nautical miles (9.3 km) south of The Highlands, Massachusetts, United States. Her crew were rescued. She was on a voyage from Liverpool to Boston, Massachusetts.
Colleen Bawn	United Kingdom	The barque was driven ashore at Kingstown, County Dublin. She was on a voyage from St. John's, Newfoundland, British North America to Dublin. She was refloated, but ran aground on the North Bull, broke her back, and was abandoned by her crew.
Coquimbo	Unknown	The full-rigged ship was lost east of Dungeness Spit on the coast of Washington Territory. She later was salvaged.
Eupheme	France	The schooner was wrecked at Druidston, Pembrokeshire, United Kingdom with the loss of six of her nine crew. She was on a voyage from Pembrey, Carmarthenshire, United Kingdom to Roscoff, Finistère.
Julia	United Kingdom	The ship was abandoned in the Atlantic Ocean. She was on a voyage from Liverpool to Havana, Cuba. She sank on 24 January.
Liberty	United Kingdom	The schooner was driven ashore at Howth, County Dublin. She was refloated with assistance from the Howth Lifeboat and taken in to Howth.
Padre	Austrian Empire	The ship was wrecked in Mounts Bay with the loss of all thirteen crew. She was on a voyage from Trieste to Falmouth, Cornwall, United Kingdom.
Poultons	United Kingdom	The schooner was driven ashore and wrecked at Tankerness, Orkney Islands. Her crew were rescued. She was on a voyage from Sunderland, County Durham to Portsoy, Aberdeenshire.
Queen of Commerce	United Kingdom	The ship was driven ashore and wrecked at "Ballymacow", County Waterford. All 24 people on board were rescued by the Coast Guard. She was on a voyage from Antwerp, Belgium to Liverpool.

== 23 January ==
List of shipwrecks: 23 January 1862
Ship	State	Description
Active	United Kingdom	The ship was driven ashore and wrecked at Waterford with the loss of all hands. She was on a voyage from Liverpool, Lancashire to Cork.
Amalies Minde	Denmark	The schooner was driven ashore on Læsø. She was on a voyage from Ebeltoft to London, United Kingdom. She was refloated and taken in to Fredrikshavn in a leaky condition.
Columbus	United Kingdom	The brig was wrecked on the Lother Rock, in the Pentland Firth, with the loss of all but one of the fifteen people on board. She was on a voyage from Leith, Lothian to the West Indies.
Deane	France	The ship was driven ashore and wrecked at Towyn, Merionethshire, United Kingdom. She was on a voyage from Cardiff, Glamorgan, United Kingdom to Cádiz, Spain.
Gregorius	Austrian Empire	The ship was driven ashore and severely damaged at "Kilredane", County Limerick, United Kingdom. She was on a voyage from Sulina, Ottoman Empire to Queenstown, County Cork and Limerick, United Kingdom. She was refloated.
Hope	United Kingdom	The smack was driven ashore and wrecked at "Gallysworth", Pembrokeshire.
Kangaroo	United Kingdom	The steamship foundered off Holyhead, Anglesey with the loss of seven of her fourteen crew. She was on a voyage from Glasgow, Renfrewshire to Bordeaux, Gironde, France.
Lady Eleanor	United Kingdom	The ship was wrecked in Golsen Bay. Her crew were rescued.
Louisiana	United States Army	American Civil War: The steamship ran aground off the coast of North Carolina, Confederate States of America for the second time since 14 January after New Brunswick (flag unknown) collided with her and carried away her anchor. She may have been refloated.
Ocean Chief	United Kingdom	The clipper was destroyed by arson at Bluff Harbour, New Zealand. Several days earlier, the ship had sustained major damage when she went aground during an attempt to enter the port.
Pardoe	Trieste	The barque was wrecked in Mounts Bay with the loss of thirteen lives. She was on a voyage from Trieste to Falmouth, Cornwall, United Kingdom.
Prudence	United Kingdom	The schooner was wrecked near Milltown, County Galway with the loss of four of her seven crew. She was on a voyage from Limerick to London.
Sophia	United Kingdom	The ship was driven ashore and wrecked at Waterford. Her crew were rescued. She was on a voyage from Cardiff, Glamorgan to Waterford.
Tiger	United States	The ship was driven ashore and wrecked at "Broomhill", County Waterford with the loss of two of her crew. She was on a voyage from Liverpool to New York and/or Boston, Massachusetts.
Unidentified schooner	Confederate States of America	American Civil War, Union blockade: Carrying a cargo of cotton and naval stores and trying to exit Mobile Bay via the eastern Swash Channel, the schooner ran aground on the coast of Alabama about 1 mile (1.6 km) east of Fort Morgan. The screw steamers USS Huntsville and USS R. R. Cuyler (both United States Navy) then burned her.

== 24 January ==
List of shipwrecks: 24 January 1862
Ship	State	Description
Angelita	United Kingdom	The ship foundered in Dunmannus Bay. Her crew survived. She was on a voyage from Minatitlán, Mexico to Liverpool, Lancashire.
Canmore	United Kingdom	The ship was driven ashore and wrecked at Tenby, Pembrokeshire. She was on a voyage from Swansea, Glamorgan to Mataró, Spain.
Charles Wyman	United States	The ship was wrecked on the Little French Key. She was on a voyage from Gonaïves, Haiti to New York.
Elgin	United Kingdom	The ship was wrecked on the Mucaras Reef. Her crew survived. She was on a voyage from Liverpool to Havana, Cuba.
Ellen Morrison	United Kingdom	The barque was driven ashore at Passage East, County Waterford. She was refloated and towed in to Waterford.
Eos	United Kingdom	The ship was driven ashore 5 nautical miles (9.3 km) south of Great Egg Harbour, New Jersey, United States. She was on a voyage from Limerick to New York, United States. She was consequently condemned.
Flimzen	Sweden	The barque was driven ashore at the Mumbles, Glamorgan. She was on a voyage from Swansea to Barcelona, Spain.
Giorgetta	United States	The ship was wrecked south of Barnegat, New Jersey with the loss of all hands. She was on a voyage from New York to Dublin, United Kingdom.
Hiawatha	United Kingdom	The ship was driven ashore on Corkbeg, County Cork. She was on a voyage from Cork to Liverpool. She was refloated and resumed her voyage.
Indian Ocean	United Kingdom	The full-rigged ship was driven ashore and wrecked at Annestown, County Waterford. All 25 crew were rescued by Europa (United Kingdom). Indian Ocean was on a voyage from Liverpool to Sydney, New South Wales.
Iyd, or Tyo	Netherlands	The galiot ran aground in the Vlie. Her crew were rescued. She was on a voyage from Harlingen, Friesland to London, United Kingdom.
Jane	United Kingdom	The ship was driven ashore near Westport, County Mayo. She was on a voyage from Liverpool to Westport. She was refloated on 28 January but drove ashore againd and was scuttled.
John and Mary	United Kingdom	The sloop was driven ashore and wrecked near "Aberbach". She was on a voyage from Caernarfon to Youghal, County Cork.
John Coggin	United Kingdom	The brig ran aground at South Shields, County Durham. She was on a voyage from London to South Shields. She was refloated and taken in to South Shields.
Julia	Confederate States of America	American Civil War, Union blockade: The schooner, a blockade runner carrying a cargo of cotton, was forced to run herself aground on the coast of Louisiana near the mouth of the Mississippi River by the screw steamer USS Mercedita and other pursuing ships of the Gulf Blockading Squadron (all United States Navy), which then burned her to prevent her from falling back into Confederate hands.
Mary Eleanor	United Kingdom	The ship was driven ashore near "Galen", County Cork. She was on a voyage from Limerick to the Kingroad.
Nevin	United Kingdom	The brig was wrecked at Brownstown, County Westmeath with the loss of a crew member. She was on a voyage from Cardiff, Glamorgan to Havana.
New Quay	Russia	The ship foundered in the Atlantic Ocean 50 nautical miles (93 km) west south west of the Isles of Scilly, United Kingdom. Her crew survived. She was on a voyage from Cardiff to Smyrna, Ottoman Empire.
USS Peri	United States Navy	American Civil War, Union blockade: The vessel, earmarked for scuttling as a blockship in Maffit's Channel in Charleston Harbor off Charleston, South Carolina, as part of the "Stone Fleet", was blown out to sea by a gale, where she drifted for three days before disappearing.
Phœbus	United Kingdom	The ship was abandoned at sea with the loss of a crew member. Survivors were rescued by Raleigh (United Kingdom). Phœbus was on a voyage from South Shields to Barcelona, Spain.
Pioneer	United Kingdom	The brig was wrecked on Cardigan Island, Cardiganshire. Seven of her eight crew took to the longboat and were presumed lost. The eighth crew member was rescued by the Cardigan Lifeboat. Pioneer was on a voyage from Galaţi, United Principalities, to Caernarfon, Wales.
Unity	United Kingdom	The ship was driven ashore at Sutton-on-Sea, Lincolnshire. She was refloated on 28 January with assistance from the tug Peep o' Day Boy (United Kingdom) and towed in to Grimsby, Lincolnshire.
Venus	United Kingdom	The schooner was driven ashore and wrecked in Ballymona Bay.
Unidentified barque	Confederate States of America	American Civil War, Union blockade: The barque, a blockade runner carrying a cargo of cotton, was forced to run herself aground on the coast of Louisiana near the mouth of the Mississippi River by the screw steamer USS Mercedita and other pursuing ships of the Gulf Blockading Squadron (all United States Navy), which then burned her to prevent her from falling back into Confederate hands.
Unnamed	Austrian Empire	The barque foundered off the coast of County Waterford, United Kingdom with the loss of all hands.
Unnamed	United Kingdom	The collier was driven ashore and wrecked at "Ballyrobbin", County Galway with the loss of all hands, at least four lives.

== 25 January ==
List of shipwrecks: 25 January 1862
Ship	State	Description
Diana	United Kingdom	The steamship ran aground on the Scharrenberg Bank, off Brielle, North Holland, Netherlands.
Energy	United Kingdom	The brigantine was wrecked at Great Castle Head, Pembrokeshire. Her crew were rescued by the barque Comet (United Kingdom).
Indian Ocean	United Kingdom	The full-rigged ship was wrecked at Annestown, County Wexford. Her crew were rescued by Europa (United Kingdom). Indian Ocean was on a voyage from Liverpool, Lancashire to Sydney, New South Wales.
Jenny	Norway	The brig was abandoned in the Atlantic Ocean. Her crew were rescued. She was on a voyage from Philadelphia, Pennsylvania, United States to Sligo, United Kingdom.
La Force	France	The brig was wrecked in Freshwater Bay with the loss of seven of her crew. She was on a voyage from Swansea, Glamorgan, United Kingdom to Senegal.
Maria	United Kingdom	The ship foundered in Ballyteague Bay.
Mayflower	United Kingdom	The brig foundered off Milford Haven, Pembrokeshire with the loss of all hands.
Prudenter	United Kingdom	The ship was beached at Douarnenez, Finistère, France. She was on a voyage from Sunderland, County Durham to Porto, Portugal.
Rokeby	United Kingdom	The ship was abandoned in the Irish Sea 70 nautical miles (130 km) west by south of Milford Haven. Her crew were rescued by an American ship, but subsequently reboarded her. She was towed in to Milford Haven in a sinking condition by the steamship Rokeby (United Kingdom).
Severn	United Kingdom	The barque foundered off Milford Haven with the loss of all hands.
Unidentified vessel	Confederate States of America	American Civil War: The vessel was sunk near Norfolk, Virginia.
Unnamed	United Kingdom	The brigantine foundered off Milford Haven with the loss of all hands.

== 26 January ==
List of shipwrecks: 26 January 1862
Ship	State	Description
Advance	United States	The 96-ton sidewheel towboat exploded on the Ohio River off Barnes Warehouse above New Matamoros, Ohio, killing three people.
RMS America	United Kingdom	The steamship ran aground at Cork. She was refloated with assistance from HMS Virago (Royal Navy) and resumed her voyage.
Asia	United Kingdom	The full-rigged ship was abandoned 102 nautical miles (189 km) off the Cape of Good Hope, Cape Colony. Her nineteen crew survived. She was on a voyage from Calcutta, India to Havre de Grâce, Seine-Inférieure, France.
USS India	United States Navy	American Civil War, Union blockade: The vessel was scuttled as a blockship in Maffit's Channel in Charleston Harbor off Charleston, South Carolina, Confederate States of America as part of the "Stone Fleet".
Jessie	United Kingdom	The schooner was driven ashore and severely damaged near Wigtown. She was on a voyage from Liverpool, Lancashire to the Clyde. She was refloated on 29 January and taken in to Garliestown, Wigtownshire.
John Hart	United States	The 220-ton sidewheel paddle steamer was stranded in Lake Nicaragua, Nicaragua.
Mary Ann	United Kingdom	The barque ran aground in the River Shannon. She was on a voyage from Cardiff, Glamorgan to Halifax, Nova Scotia, British North America. She was refloated.
Spuell and Moss	Confederate States of America	American Civil War: Confederate forces scuttled the schooner as a blockship off Weir's Point on Roanoke Island, North Carolina.

== 27 January ==
List of shipwrecks: 27 January 1862
Ship	State	Description
Annie Porter	United Kingdom	The ship ran aground at Berbice, British Guiana. She was on a voyage from Berbice to London. She was refloated on 27 February and taken in to Berbice.
Ella	United Kingdom	The schooner was run down and sunk by a steamship in the River Mersey. Her crew survived. She was on a voyage from Newport, Monmouthshire to Liverpool, Lancashire.
Hercules	United Kingdom	The ship ran aground on Dragør, Denmark.
Zenith	Confederate States of America	American Civil War: Confederate forces scuttled the vessel as a blockship off Weir's Point on Roanoke Island, North Carolina.

== 28 January ==
List of shipwrecks: 28 January 1862
Ship	State	Description
Angelica	Italy	The ship was driven ashore at Creden Head, County Waterford, United Kingdom. She was on a voyage from New York, United States to Newcastle upon Tyne, Northumberland, United Kingdom.
Elizabeth	United Kingdom	The ship sprang a leak and ran aground off the north Norfolk coast. She was on a voyage from Newcastle upon Tyne to Great Yarmouth, Norfolk. She was refloated and taken in to Grimsby, Lincolnshire.
John & Isabella	United Kingdom	The ship struck the Sizewell Bank, in the North Sea off the coast of Suffolk, and foundered. Her five crew and the ship's dog were rescued by the Southwold Lifeboat ( (United Kingdom of Great Britain and Ireland) Royal National Lifeboat Institution).
Mersey	United Kingdom	The barque ran aground at North Shields, Northumberland. She was refloated.
Princess Alice	United Kingdom	The ship ran aground on the Sizewell Bank and sank. Her five crew took to a boat and were rescued by the Southwold Lifeboat. Princess Alice was on a voyage from Seaham, county Durham to Ipswich, Suffolk.
Rio	Confederate States of America	American Civil War: Confederate forces scuttled the schooner as a blockship off Weir's Point on Roanoke Island, North Carolina.
Sally	United Kingdom	The ship was driven ashore and sank at "Muldhor", Renfrewshire. Her crew were rescued.
W. A. Brown	United States	The brigantine foundered in the Bristol Channel 20 nautical miles (37 km) west of Lundy Island, Devon, United Kingdom. Her crew were rescued by Corinthian (Denmark). W. A. Brown was on a voyage from Newport, Monmouthshire, United Kingdom to Montevideo, Uruguay.
Unnamed	United Kingdom	The collier was driven ashore at Youghal, County Cork with the loss of all hands, at least four lives.

== 29 January ==
List of shipwrecks: 29 January 1862
Ship	State	Description
Cheviot	United Kingdom	The ship was run into and sunk by the steamship Ætna (United Kingdom) 5 nautical miles (9.3 km) west of Holyhead, Anglesey with the loss of 33 of her 34 crew. Cheviot was on a voyage from Bombay, India to Liverpool, Lancashire.
Feof	United Kingdom	The brig was driven ashore at "Dunally" or "Dunworky", County Cork. She was on a voyage from Odesa to Queenstown, County Cork.
Flying Dragon	United States	Carrying a cargo of coal, the 1,127-ton full-rigged ship sank in a storm near Arch Rock in San Francisco Bay, California.
Hector	United Kingdom	The brig was driven ashore on Skagen, Denmark. Her crew were rescued. She was on a voyage from Newcastle upon Tyne, Northumberland to Rostock.
Jacob Horton	United States	The ship was wrecked at Granville, Manche, France with the loss of one of her 23 crew. Eighteen survivors were rescued by Moise Roux (France). Jacob Horton was on a voyage from Calcutta, India to London, United Kingdom.
Maria	United Kingdom	The galiot was driven ashore and wrecked on Texel, North Holland, Netherlands. Her crew were rescued. She was on a voyage from Newcastle upon Tyne, Northumberland to Rotterdam, South Holland, Netherlands.
Neptune	United Kingdom	The ship was driven ashore at Lowestoft, Suffolk. She was on a voyage from Newcastle upon Tyne to Gravelines, Nord, France. She was refloated the next day and taken in to Lowestoft.
HMS Shannon	Royal Navy	The Liffey-class frigate ran aground on the Calshot Spit. She was refloated.
Thomas Fielden	United Kingdom	The full-rigged ship was abandoned in the Atlantic Ocean. Her crew were rescued by the barque Alma (United Kingdom). Thomas Fielden was on a voyage from Saint John, New Brunswick, British North America to Liverpool, Lancashire.
Tripleet	Confederate States of America	American Civil War: Confederate forces scuttled the schooner as a blockship off Weir's Point on Roanoke Island, North Carolina.
Union	United Kingdom	The brig ran aground on the Holme Sand, in the North Sea off the coast of Suffolk. She was on a voyage from Hartlepool, County Durham to Chatham, Kent. She was refloated.
William Edward	United Kingdom	The ship was abandoned in the North Sea. Her crew were rescued. She was on a voyage from Alloa, Clackmannanshire to Rouen, Seine-Inférieure, France. She was taken in to Great Yarmouth, Norfolk in a derelict condition.

== 30 January ==
List of shipwrecks: 30 January 1862
Ship	State	Description
Crown	United Kingdom	The brig ran aground on the Longsand, in the North Sea off the coast of Essex. She was on a voyage from Newcastle upon Tyne, Northumberland to Bahia, Brazil. She was refloated and taken in to Lowestoft, Suffolk in a leaky condition.
Hector	Rostock	The ship was wrecked on Skagen, Denmark.
Hetton	United Kingdom	The steamship collided with a barque in the North Sea off the coast of Yorkshire. She was towed in to Scarborough by the tug Ryhope (United Kingdom), where she sank.
Huguenot	United Kingdom	The barque was driven ashore at "Metimont", Pas-de-Calais, France. Her eighteen crew were rescued. She was on a voyage from Colombo, Ceylon to London.
Industry	United Kingdom	The Yorkshire Billyboy was run down and sunk in the Swin by the steamship General Havelock (United Kingdom), which rescued her crew.
Maryland	Unknown	Carrying a cargo of coffee, the barque was wrecked at Inagua in the Bahamas.

== 31 January ==
List of shipwrecks: 31 January 1862
Ship	State	Description
Barbara Davidson	United Kingdom	The schooner was wrecked at Cayeux-sur-Mer, Somme, France. Her crew were rescued. She was on a voyage from Teignmouth, Devon to Newcastle upon Tyne, Northumberland.
Colmar	Sweden	The ship was lost near Onsala. She was on a voyage from Rio de Janeiro, Brazil to Gothenburg.
Onward	United Kingdom	The paddle tug struck the pier at North Shields, Northumberland and sank. Her crew were rescued. She was refloated on 4 February.
Sirocco	United Kingdom	The brig ran aground on the Gunfleet Sand, in the North Sea off the coast of Essex. She was on a voyage from Sunderland, County Durham to London. She was refloated with assistance and resumed her voyage.
Southern Star	Confederate States of America	American Civil War: Confederate forces scuttled the schooner, in ballast, as a blockship off Weir's Point on Roanoke Island, North Carolina.

== Unknown date ==
List of shipwrecks: Unknown date in January 1862
Ship	State	Description
Abelazado	Portugal	The ship was wrecked at Porto before 15 February.
Aberfoyle	United Kingdom	The ship was abandoned in the Atlantic Ocean. She was on a voyage from New York, United States to Hull, Yorkshire.
Agnes	United Kingdom	The ship was wrecked at Porto before 15 January.
Alfred Herman	Bremen	The schooner was wrecked on Formosa. Her crew survived.
Alice	United Kingdom	The barque foundered in the Atlantic Ocean. Her crew were rescued by Britannia and Canada (both United Kingdom). Alice was on a voyage from Sunderland, County Durham to Mauritius.
Alice Maud	United States	The ship was driven ashore at Bass Harbor, Maine. She was refloated and taken in to Eastport, Maine for repairs.
Argentine	Austrian Empire	The ship was driven ashore at Clardott Point before 22 January. She was on a voyage from Odesa to an English port. She was refloated with assistance from a steamship and taken in to Gallipoli, Ottoman Empire.
Arizona	United States	The sternwheel paddle steamer struck an abutment on the Ohio River at Louisville, Kentucky, and sank in mid-January. She was refloated in mid-February.
Ashburton	(United Kingdom of Great Britain and Ireland) South Australia	The ship ran aground at Adelaide. She was declared a total loss.
Belle Pauline	France	The ship was driven ashore and wrecked at Cadaqués, Spain.
Bogota	United States	American Civil War, Union blockade: Loaded with 300 short tons (272 metric tons/tonnes) of stone, the 300-ton merchant ship was scuttled as a blockship in Maffitt's Channel in Charleston Harbor off Charleston, South Carolina, Confederate States of America as part of the "Stone Fleet" on either 25 or 26 January.
Bonne Mère	United Kingdom	The ship was destroyed by fire at Rosas, Spain.
Cairo	United Kingdom	The barque was lost off Berdyansk, Russia. Three crew were rescued by the brig Fanny (United Kingdom).
Cheronese	Russian Empire	The steamship ran ashore in Kertch Bay before 3 January.
Christen	United Kingdom	The ship was lost in the Mediterranean Sea before 6 January. She was on a voyage from Newcastle upon Tyne, Northumberland to Venice, Kingdom of Lombardy–Venetia.
Clorinde	France	The ship was driven ashore. She was on a voyage from Oran, Algeria to Cette, Hérault. She was refloated.
Cynisca	United States	The fishing schooner left Gloucester, Massachusetts on 13 December 1861 and vanished, probably lost on 1 January on the Georges Bank in a gale. Lost with all 9 hands.
Destinado	United Kingdom	The ship was driven ashore at Rye, Sussex. She was on a voyage from Africa to London. She was refloated and taken in tow for London.
Dictator	Unknown	The barque capsized in the Pacific Ocean off the United States West Coast between Puget Sound in Washington Territory and San Francisco, California.
Diligent	France	The ship was driven ashore. She was on a voyage from Alicante, Spain to Nice, Alpes-Maritimes. She was refloated.
Dove	United States	American Civil War, Union blockade: The 146- or 151-ton bark, a former whaler, was scuttled as a blockship in Maffitt's Channel in Charleston Harbor off Charleston, South Carolina as part of the "Stone Fleet" on either 25 or 26 January.
Edith	United States	The ship was wrecked at Porto before 15 January.
Ellen	United Kingdom	The brig was abandoned in the Atlantic Ocean. Her crew were rescued by Mary Heaton (United Kingdom). Ellen was on a voyage from New York to Queenstown, County Cork or Liverpool, Lancashire.
Fanny	United Kingdom	The brig was wrecked near Sinope, Ottoman Empire with the loss of all on board.
Forest King	United Kingdom	The ship foundered. She was on a voyage from Coquimbo, Chile to Queenstown.
George Avery	United Kingdom	The ship was presumed to have foundered in the Black Sea before 22 January with the loss of all hands.
Grapeshot	United States Army	While under tow in the North Atlantic Ocean with a cargo of hay and oats, the armed transport parted the hawser during a storm that struck from 13 to 16 January and was driven ashore on the Outer Banks of North Carolina, Confederate States of America 14 miles (22.5 km) north of Cape Hatteras.
Hamilton	United Kingdom	The ship foundered off Double Island, Hong Kong. She was on a voyage from Swatow, China to Singapore, Straits Settlements.
Ictíneo I	Spain	The privately owned experimental submarine was destroyed while she was berthed at Barcelona, Spain, when a cargo ship collided with her.
Iskandria	United States	The brig was wrecked on Formosa. Her crew survived.
John Bonham	United Kingdom	The ship foundered between 4 and 14 January. she was on a voyage from Liverpool to Halifax, Nova Scotia, British North America. Wreckage from the ship washed up at Fleetwood, Lancashire.
Jubilee	United States	American Civil War, Union blockade: The 233-ton barque, a former merchant ship loaded with stone, was scuttled]as a blockship in Maffitt's Channel in Charleston Harbor as part of the "Stone Fleet" on either 25 or 26 January.
Kaluna	Unknown	The 96-ton schooner was wrecked on Humboldt Bar in Humboldt Bay on the coast of California.
Lais	United Kingdom	The ship was driven ashore near Southampton, New York, United States. She was on a voyage from Belfast, County Antrim to New York City.
Lifeboat	United States	The schooner left Gloucester, Massachusetts 27 December 1861 and vanished. Probably lost in the 1 January gale. lost with all 9 hands.
Loodianah	United Kingdom	The ship was abandoned in the Indian Ocean. Her crew were rescued by Nagasaki (Flag unknown). Loodianah was on a voyage from Moulmein, Burma to Queenstown and/or Liverpool. She was taken in to Galle, Ceylon by Nagasaki.
Maia	United Kingdom	The ship was destroyed by fire at Maceió, Brazil. She was on a voyage from Bahia, Brazil to Liverpool.
Majestic	United States	American Civil War, Union blockade: The 397-ton full-rigged ship was scuttled as a blockship in Maffitt's Channel in Charleston Harbor, as part of the "Stone Fleet" on either 25 or 26 January.
Margaret Scott	United States	American Civil War, Union blockade: The 330-ton barque was scuttled as a blockship in Maffitt's Channel as part of the "Stone Fleet" on either 25 or 26 January.
Maria	United Kingdom	The ship sank in Liverpool Bay. She was on a voyage from Liverpool, Lancashire to Paramaribo, Brazil. She was refloated on 7 January and beached at Egremont, Lancashire.
Marmion	United Kingdom	The barque was wrecked near "Carabournou", Ottoman Empire before 9 January with the loss of all hands. She was on a voyage from Odesa to an English port.
Mary Lee	United Kingdom	The ship caught fire at Shanghai, China and was scuttled.
Mechanic	United States	American Civil War, Union blockade: The 335-ton full-rigged ship, a former whaler, was scuttled as a blockship in Maffitt's Channel as part of the "Stone Fleet" on either 25 or 26 January.
Messenger	United States	American Civil War, Union blockade: The 216-ton barque, a former whaler, was scuttled as a blockship in Maffitt's Channel in Charleston Harbor, as part of the "Stone Fleet" on either 25 or 26 January.
Metropolitan	United States	American Civil War: The barque was captured and burnt in the Mediterranean Sea by CSS Sumter (Confederate States Navy) before 19 January. She was on a voyage from Messina, Sicily, Italy to Boston, Massachusetts.
Miles Standish	United Kingdom	The ship was wrecked in the Timor Strait. Her crew were rescued by Ville de Dieppe (France). Miles Standish was on a voyage from Cardiff, Glamorgan to Hong Kong.
Mona's Queen	(United Kingdom of Great Britain and Ireland) Isle of Man	The paddle steamer collided with the steamship Sligo (United Kingdom) in the River Mersey
Navinto	United Kingdom	The ship was abandoned in the North Sea before 27 January. She was on a voyage from Moulmein to Leith, Lothian.
Newburyport	United States	American Civil War, Union blockade: The 341-ton full-rigged ship, a former whaler, was scuttled as a blockship in Maffitt's Channel as part of the "Stone Fleet" on either 25 or 26 January.
USS New England	United States Navy	American Civil War, Union blockade: The 336- or 368-ton full-rigged ship, a former whaler, was scuttled as a blockship in Maffit's Channel as part of the "Stone Fleet" on either 25 or 26 January.
Noble	United States	American Civil War, Union blockade: The 274-ton barque, a former whaler loaded with stone, was scuttled as a blockship in Maffitt's Channel as part of the "Stone Fleet" on either 25 or 26 January.
Oscar	(United Kingdom of Great Britain and Ireland) New South Wales	The steamship was wrecked at Invercargill, New Zealand. All on board were rescued.
Pelissier	France	The steamship was wrecked at "Pandurma", Ottoman Empire before 15 February.
Queen Esther	United Kingdom	The ship was abandoned in the Atlantic Ocean. Her crew were rescued. She was on a voyage from Saint John's, Newfoundland to Cuba.
Rambler	United Kingdom	The ship was abandoned at sea. She was on a voyage from Cuba to an English port.
Republic	United States	The steamer was lost at the Golden Gate off San Francisco, California.
R. H. Gamble	United States	The barque foundered in the Atlantic Ocean. Her crew were rescued. She was on a voyage from the Rio Grande to Queenstown.
Rosalie	Unknown	The schooner was stranded at Point Arena, California.
Sappho	United Kingdom	The brig was driven ashore and wrecked at Safi, Morocco.
Scandinavian	United Kingdom	The ship foundered in the Atlantic Ocean. Her crew were rescued. She was on a voyage from London to Rio de Janeiro, Brazil.
Saline	United Kingdom	The ship foundered "east of Benley". She was on a voyage from Liverpool to Antwerp, Belgium.
San José	Spain	The ship was driven ashore at French Wells, Bahamas. She was on a voyage from St. Jago de Cuba, Cuba to Swansea, Glamorgan. She was refloated and taken in to Nassau, Bahamas where she arrived on 7 January.
Sparking Wave	Unknown	The schooner was lost in the Pacific Ocean during a voyage from San Francisco, California, to Shoalwater Bay, Queensland.
USS Stephen Young	United States Navy	American Civil War, Union blockade: The 200-ton brig, a former merchant ship, was scuttled as a blockship in Maffit's Channel as part of the "Stone Fleet".
T. H. Allen	Unknown	The 48-ton schooner was wrecked with the loss of one life while trying to cross Humboldt Bay on the coast of California.
Thomas Sparks	United Kingdom	The ship was wrecked at Hong Kong before 10 January.
USS Timor	United States Navy	American Civil War, Union blockade: The 289-ton full-rigged ship was scuttled in Maffitt's Channel as part of the "Stone Fleet".
CSS Tuscarora	Confederate States Navy	The armed sidewheel paddle steamer was destroyed at New Orleans, Louisiana, by an accidental fire.
Vesta	United Kingdom	The ship was abandoned at sea. Her crew were rescued by Canada (United Kingdom). Vesta was on a voyage from a Spanish port to an English port.
Victor Henri	France	The ship was wrecked at Benicarló, Spain. Her crew were rescued. She was on a voyage from Cette to Oran.
Village Belle	(United Kingdom of Great Britain and Ireland) British North America	The ship was abandoned in the Atlantic Ocean before 20 January. She was on a voyage from Nova Scotia to the West Indies.
Vrie Gezusters	Danzig	The ship was driven ashore on Anholt, Denmark before 15 January. She was on a voyage from Datzig to Grangemouth, Stirlingshire, United Kingdom.
Unidentified barge	United States	The barge sank off the coast of North Carolina on the outer Hatteras Bar in early January.
