= Boatstrand =

Fishing village in County Waterford, Ireland

Boatstrand Trá na mBád
- Village
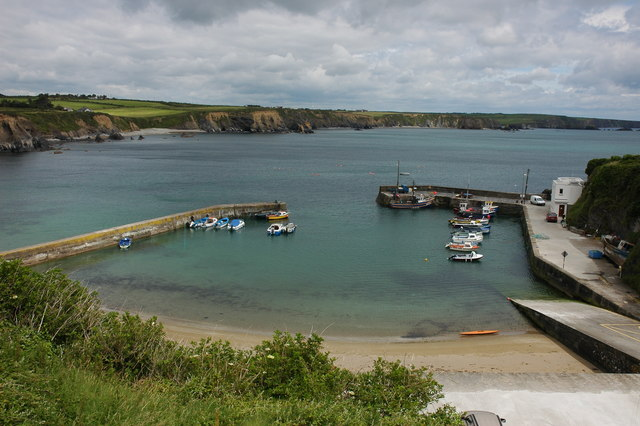
- Harbour below Dunabrattin Head

- Location in Ireland
- Coordinates: 52°08′13″N 7°18′25″W
- Country: Ireland
- Province: Munster
- County: County Waterford
- Time zone: UTC+0 (WET)
  - Summer (DST): UTC-1 (IST (WEST))

Boatstrand (Irish: Trá na mBád) is a coastal village on the Copper Coast, Ireland, which lies between Annestown and Bunmahon.

It consists of around 14 cottages and has a tiny fishing cove which is very popular in the summer time, from which a small fishing fleet and leisure craft launch. The dock dates back to the 1800s and is a hub of activity, especially in the summer months. It is also home to Dunbrattin Head, one of the best fishing spots in County Waterford. This is due to the rocks at the end of the head, which attract fish like mackerel due to the warmer temperatures there. It is also a popular point for sea swimming, with many swimmers using Boatstrand as the finish point for their swim. A popular swim is from Kilmurrin cove to Boatstrand.

The promontory fort at Dunabrattin is the largest found along the Waterford coastline, covering an area of around 6 hectares. The fort protected a Celtic clan called the Brattins who lived at this cliff top location around 2,000 years ago.

== Gallery ==
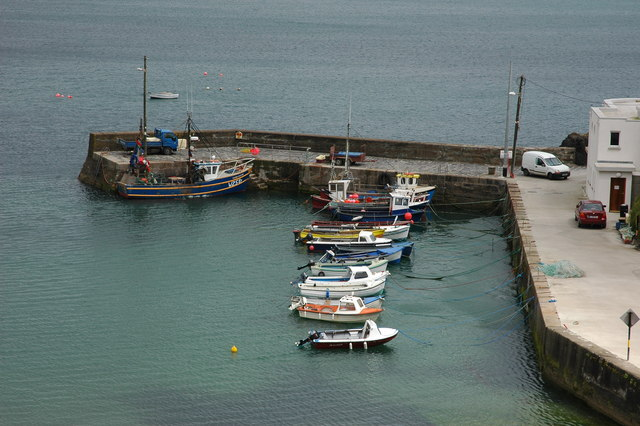
Boats in harbour

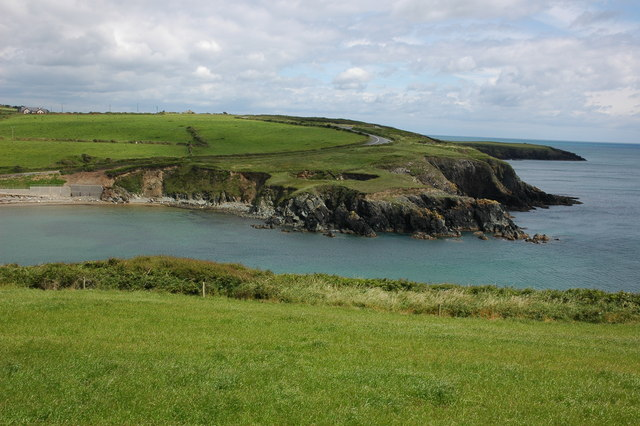
Coast to the west of Dunabrattin Head
