= USS Meteor (1819) =

History

United States
- Name: USS Meteor
- Namesake: Previous name retained
- Launched: 1819
- Acquired: 4 November 1861
- Fate: Scuttled as a blockship, 9 January 1862

General characteristics
- Type: Whaler
- Sail plan: Full-rigged ship

The first USS Meteor retained her commercial name when the United States Navy purchased her for the "Stone Fleet." She was sunk as an obstruction in Charleston Harbor off Charleston, South Carolina, in January 1862.

Meteor, a full‑rigged sailing ship, was built in Newburyport, Massachusetts, in 1819. From 1822 to 1825, she was one of the ships of the New York-to-Liverpool Red Star Packet Line. In 1830 she became a whaler, her role until 1856. Purchased by the U.S. Navy at Mystic, Connecticut, on 4 November 1861, she was sunk on 9 January 1862 as part of the "Stone Fleet" to help obstruct blockade‑running commerce along the coasts of North Carolina, South Carolina, and Georgia.
