= USS American (1861) =

History

United States
- Acquired: 1 November 1861
- Fate: Sunk 20 December 1861

General characteristics
- Type: Whaler
- Tonnage: 329 tons
- Sail plan: Bark

USS American was a bark of 329 tons, a former whaler, purchased 1 November 1861 at Edgartown, Massachusetts for the Stone Fleet at a cost of $3,370. She left New Bedford, Massachusetts on 20 November 1861, and was intentionally sunk as an obstruction to shipping in the main channel of the harbor of Charleston, South Carolina on 20 December 1861. This ship has sometimes been recorded as America.

Originally planned to have been sunk in the harbor of Savannah, Georgia, when the whalers began to arrive in waters off Savannah, they found the Southern defenders of that port had been alarmed by the Union Army conquest of Port Royal, South Carolina, and had decided to evacuate Tybee Island and relocate its batteries to Fort Pulaski. Moreover, to prevent Northern warships from bringing their guns within range of the latter stronghold, they had sunk old hulks in narrow points of the channel and, ironically, had already carried out the mission of Union's stone bearing whalers. As a result, American and most of her consorts sailed for Port Royal on the 10th and 11th. There, Flag Officer DuPont decided that these ships could be put to good use as obstructions in the main channel in Charleston Harbor. They were moved to that port, and American was sunk in the main channel there on 20 December 1861.
