= USS Robin Hood =

USS Robin Hood was a 400-foot-long (120 m) ship of 395 tons, purchased by the United States Navy in Mystic, Connecticut, during the American Civil War on 20 October 1861 for use in the "Stone Fleet." In December 1861 she was sunk as an obstruction in Charleston Harbor off Charleston, South Carolina.

== See also ==
- Union Blockade
