= USS Rebecca Sims =

History

United States
- Name: Rebecca Sims
- Launched: 1801
- Acquired: 21 October 1861
- In service: 1861
- Out of service: 1861
- Fate: Sunk, 19–20 December 1861

General characteristics
- Tonnage: 400 tons
- Length: not known
- Beam: not known
- Propulsion: sail
- Speed: not known
- Complement: not known

USS Rebecca Sims was built as a general trading ship in 1801 by Samuel Bowers of Philadelphia, Pennsylvania, for Joseph Sims.

During the American Civil War she was acquired by the Union Navy, which used her as part of the stone fleet of obstructions of the ports and waterways of the Confederate States of America.

== Commercial cargo service ==
Refitted during the winter of 1806-07, she set a record of 14 days on an eastbound run from Cape Henlopen, Delaware, to the mouth of the River Mersey (Liverpool, England) in May 1807.

== Converted into a whaler ==
She was eventually taken out of general trading service; refitted as a whaler, and, by 1850, was sailing from New Bedford, Massachusetts, on extended voyages to the South Atlantic Ocean and to the Pacific Ocean.

She is also known for capturing the wounded sperm whale responsible for the sinking of the Ann Alexander off the coast of the Galapagos Islands.

== Acquired by the Union Navy ==
Still operating at the outbreak of the Civil War, Rebecca Sims was acquired by the Union Navy at Fairhaven, Massachusetts, on 21 October 1861 for use in the Stone Fleet, the ships which were to be sunk as obstacles in the shipping channels of the South's major ports.

The whaler was stripped of all unnecessary equipment; filled with stone; and, under the command of her previous master, James M. Willis, sent south in late November. In early December, she arrived off Savannah, Georgia, whence, at mid-month, she proceeded to Port Royal, South Carolina. On 19–20 December, she and 16 other ships were sunk in the main channel of Charleston Harbor.

== See also ==
- Union Blockade
