= USS New England (1861) =

The first USS New England was a whaler purchased by the Union Navy at New London, Connecticut, on November 21, 1861.

New England was used in the "Stone Fleet" as an obstruction at Maffit's Channel, Charleston Harbor, South Carolina, on January 25, 1862.

== See also ==
- Union Blockade
