= USS Tenedos =

USS Tenedos, a bark of 245 tons, 300 feet (91 m) long, was originally a Pacific whaler, owned by Lawrence and Company of New London, Connecticut. During the American Civil War, the United States Navy purchased her on 16 October 1861 for use in the "Stone Fleet," a group of ships to be sunk as obstructions along the coast of the Confederate States of America. Under the command of Master O. Sisson, she was sunk as blockship in Charleston Harbor off Charleston, South Carolina, on 19 or 20 December 1861.

== See also ==
- Union Navy
- Union Blockade
