= Stone Fleet =

Ships sunk to blockade Charleston during the American Civil War

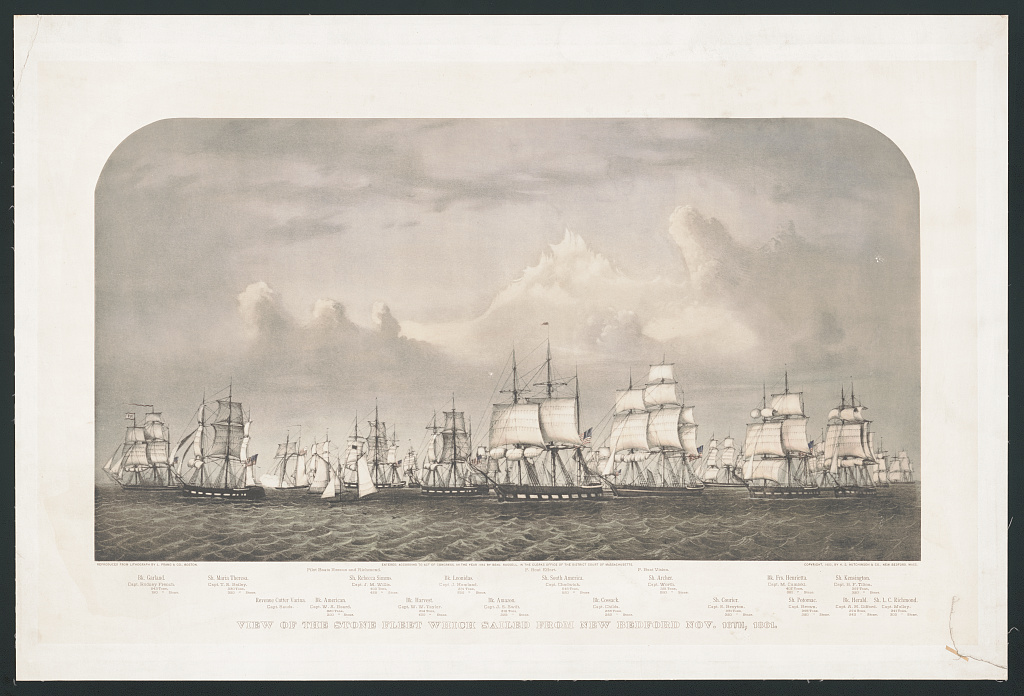
View of the Stone Fleet which sailed from New Bedford, Nov. 16, 1861

The Stone Fleet consisted of a fleet of aging ships (mostly whaleships) purchased in New Bedford and other New England ports, loaded with stone, and sailed south during the American Civil War by the Union Navy for use as blockships. They were to be deliberately sunk at the entrance of Charleston Harbor, South Carolina, in the hope of obstructing blockade runners, then supplying Confederate interests. Although some sank along the way and others were sunk near Tybee Island, Georgia, to serve as breakwaters, wharves for the landing of Union troops, the majority were divided into two lesser fleets. One fleet was sunk to block the south channel off Morris Island, and the other to block the north channel near Rattlesnake Shoals off the present day Isle of Palms in what proved to be failed efforts to block access the main shipping channels into Charleston Harbor.

== History ==
Various old ships, specifically purchased by the Navy for this purpose, were loaded with stone and sand, or filled with dirt, then towed to a designated spot and sunk as a hazard to all craft that passed. Twenty-four whaleships were sunk in Charleston Harbor by Captain Charles Henry Davis, beginning on 19 December 1861. A second fleet of 12 to 20 vessels was sunk in nearby Mafitt's Channel in 1862. The operation was under the direction of Samuel Francis DuPont, Flag Officer commanding the South Atlantic Blockading Squadron. Confederate general Robert E. Lee called the measure "an abortive expression of the malice and revenge of a people", and correctly deduced that the decision to try to block the harbor meant that the Union was not planning to attack Charleston in the near future.

The event inspired Herman Melville to write the poem "The Stone Fleet".

== List of ships in the Stone Fleet ==
- Amazon, a 318-ton bark-rigged whaleship of Fairhaven, Massachusetts, purchased on 30 October 1861 and laden with 325 tons of stone. Sunk as an obstruction at Charleston, South Carolina, on 19 or 20 December 1861.
- American, a 329-ton bark-rigged whaleship of Edgartown, Massachusetts, purchased on 1 November 1861. Laden with 300 tons of stone she was sunk in the main channel off Charleston, South Carolina on 20 December 1861.
- Archer, 322 tons. Purchased by the Navy on 28 October 1861 at a cost of $3,360. Sunk at the entrance to Charleston Harbor on 20 December 1861. Captained by William North.
- Augustus Holly, a schooner purchased at Baltimore by the Union Navy on 13 August 1861. Records of her use are missing, and it is questionable whether she was actually used for this purpose.
- Corea, a 336-ton armed store ship of the Royal Navy captured by fishermen from New Bedford, Massachusetts during the American Revolution, and later served as a whaleship. Reportedly she was not sunk and was in service with the US Army as late as 8 January 1862.
- Cossack, a 254-ton bark beached on Tybee Island, Georgia, to act as a wharf for the landing of troops on 8 December 1861.
- Courier, 381 tons
- Fortune, 292 tons, whaleship
- Frances Henrietta, a whaleship from New Bedford, Massachusetts. She was purchased for $4,000 by George Morgan and R. H. Chappell on 19 October 1861. There is evidence she was transferred to the US Army and was still afloat as late as 8 January 1862.
- Garland, a 243-ton ship from New Bedford, Massachusetts that was captained by Rodney French. French had been elected leader of the fleet by his fellow captains and went by the title "Commodore of the stone fleet". The Garland was the last of its fleet to arrive because French took a coastal route while the other ships sailed offshore and held a good wind. Sunk on 19 or 20 December 1861.
- Harvest, was a whaleship that operated out of New England. She was purchased on 21 October 1861, by Morgan and Chappell for $4,000. She arrived off Savannah, Georgia, on 4 December. Records state that she was retained for use as a coal scow.
- Herald, a 274-ton whaleship active in the Pacific. Her home port was New Bedford, Massachusetts, original owner and master George H. Cash. She was purchased for $4,000 and sunk along with 15 other vessels on 20 December 1861, about four miles south-southeast of Fort Sumter and three miles east-southeast of the light on Morris Island.
- Kensington, a 357-ton wooden, ship-rigged vessel purchased for $4,000 at New Bedford, Massachusetts, on 28 October 1861. She departed 20 November and arrived Port Royal, South Carolina by 17 December. She was presumably sunk in the main channel leading into Charleston Harbor on 21 December, about four miles south-southeast of Fort Sumter and three miles east-southeast of the light on Morris Island.
- L. C. Richmond, a 341-ton whaleship that began service in Pacific in 1834. She was purchased for $4,000 and with Captain Martin Malloy, she sailed from New Bedford on 20 November 1861. She was sunk along with 15 other vessels on 20 December, about four miles south-southeast of Fort Sumter and three miles east-southeast of the light on Morris Island.
- Leonidas, originally built as a whaling bark of 231 tons, 320 feet long. It was active in the Pacific Ocean in 1849, captained by Captain Swift of New Bedford, Massachusetts. From 1850 to 1854, it was partially owned, and captained by, Benjamin Smith Clark Jr. It was purchased on 27 October 1861 by the US Navy for $3,050. It sailed from New Bedford in charge of Master John Howland on 20 November. Exactly one month later, it was intentionally sunk, along with 15 other vessels, about four miles south-southeast of Fort Sumter and three miles east-southeast of the light on Morris Island.
- Lewis, a sailing ship of 308 tons. It was purchased on 20 October 1861. It ran aground and bilged near Tybee Island in December 1861. She was 101 feet in length, 26 feet 2 inches in breadth, 13 feet 1 inch in depth of hull, with two decks, three masts, a square stern, no galleries and a billet head.
- Maria Theresa, a 330-ton ship purchased on 31 October 1861 for $4,000. It was sunk, along with 15 other vessels about four miles south-southeast of Fort Sumter and three miles east-southeast of the light on Morris Island.
- Meteor, a ship purchased at Mystic, Connecticut on 4 November 1861, and sunk on 9 January 1862.
- Phoenix, a whaleship of 404 tons, sunk as a breakwater for Union troops invading Tybee Island in December 1861.
- Peter DeMill, a 300-ton bark purchased on 9 November 1861 and beached with South America and Cossack on 8 December to serve as a wharf during the landing of Union troops at Tybee Island, Georgia, at the mouth of the Savannah River.
- Potomac, an old 356-ton whaleship purchased on 1 November 1861 at Nantucket, and sunk on 9 January 1862.
- Rebecca Sims (or Rebecca Simms or Rebecca Ann), 400 tons. Built as a general trading ship in 1801, she was eventually refitted as a whaleship, and, by 1850, was sailing from New Bedford. Rebecca Sims was acquired by the Navy at Fairhaven, Massachusetts, on 21 October 1861, stripped of all unnecessary equipment, filled with stone, and, under the command of her previous master, James M. Willis, sent south. On 19–20 December, she and 16 other ships were sunk in the main channel of Charleston Harbor.
- Robin Hood, East Indiaman, 395 tons, 400 feet. Purchased by the Navy at Mystic, Connecticut, on 20 October 1861. Sunk in the main channel of Charleston, South Carolina, in December 1861.
- Sarah M. Kemp, a schooner purchased at Baltimore, Maryland, on 13 August 1861. The ship was to be sunk in the channel leading into the North Carolina sounds; however, no record of her final disposition has been found.
- South America, a 606-ton whaleship purchased on 9 November 1861 at New London, Connecticut. She was beached with Peter Demill and Cossack on 8 December 1861 to serve as a wharf during the landing of troops at Tybee Island, Georgia, at the mouth of the Savannah River.
- Tenedos, 245 tons, 300 feet, mentioned in Melville's poem. Purchased for the Navy at New London, Connecticut, on 16 October 1861 by George D. Morgan and R. H. Chappell. Under Master O. Sisson she was loaded with blocks of granite from New England and sailed on 20 November 1861. On 19–20 December Tenedos and 15 other ships were sunk off the bar of Charleston's main channel.

== List of ships in the second fleet ==
- America (ship), 418 tons
- Dove (bark), 151 tons
- Edward (bark), 274 tons
- Emerald (ship), 518 tons
- India (ship, 366 tons), purchased at New Bedford, Massachusetts, on 14 November 1861, and sunk in the Maffitt's Channel approach to Charleston on 26 January 1862.
- Jubilee (bark), 233 tons
- Majestic (bark), 297 tons
- Marcia (bark), 356 tons
- Margaret Scott (bark), 330 tons. This ship was bought from the US Marshall in New Bedford, after it had been confiscated as a slave ship. She was sunk 20 January 1862 in Maffitt's Channel in Charleston harbor. A woman named Margaret Scott had been executed in 1692 as one of the Salem Witches.
- Mechanic (ship), 335 tons
- Messenger (bark), 216 tons
- USS Montezuma, 424 tons
- Newburyport (ship), 341 tons, launched at Newbury in 1834
- New England (ship), 368 tons
- Noble (bark), 274 tons
- Peri (bark), 261 tons, missing off Charleston, South Carolina, 25 January 1862
- Stephen Young (brig), 200 tons
- Timor (ship)
- Valparaiso (ship), 402 tons
- William Lee, a bark of 311 tons, built as a whaler in 1836. Mentioned in Melville's poem as the Lee.

== See also ==
- American Civil War
- Union blockade
- Union Navy

== Bibliography ==
- Treasures of the Confederate Coast: the "real Rhett Butler" & Other Revelations by Dr. E. Lee Spence, (Narwhal Press, Charleston/Miami, 1995)ISBN 1886391017 ISBN 1886391009, OCLC: 32431590
- Shipwreck Encyclopedia of the Civil War: South Carolina & Georgia, 1861-1865 by Edward Lee Spence (Sullivan's Island, S.C., Shipwreck Press, 1991) OCLC: 24420089
- Shipwrecks of South Carolina and Georgia : (includes Spence's List, 1520-1865) by E. Lee Spence, Sullivan's Island, S.C. (Sullivan's Island 29482, Sea Research Society, 1984) OCLC 10593079
- Shipwrecks, Pirates & Privateers: Sunken Treasures of the Upper South Carolina Coast, 1521-1865 by E. Lee Spence, (Narwhal Press, Charleston/Miami, 1995) ISBN 1-886391-07-6
- Phillips, Stephen Willard, ed. (1937). Ship registers of the district of Newburyport, Massachusetts, 1789–1870. The Essex institute. hdl:2027/mdp.39015020914993. OCLC 3025487.
