= USS Timor =

USS Timor was purchased at Sag Harbor, New York on 30 October 1861. She was sunk as part of the Stone Fleet at Maffitts channel in Charleston harbor on 25 or 26 January 1862.

== See also ==
- Union Navy
- Union Blockade
