= USS Stephen Young =

Coordinates: 32.744°N 79.830°W

USS Stephen Young was one of the ships of the Stone Fleet, sunk in the harbor of Charleston, South Carolina to be used as a blockade during the American Civil War.

The 200-ton merchant brig was purchased by the Union Navy on 27 November 1861 in Boston, Massachusetts. She sailed from Boston on 10 December, and was sunk in Maffitt's Channel of Charleston harbor on 25 or 26 January 1862.

This Stephen Young may be the merchantman cargo ship Stephen J. Young, that was previously captained by Isaac D. Seyburn, a Union naval officer who later helped maintain the blockade in this area.

== See also ==
- Union Blockade
