= USS Amazon =

History

United States
- Acquired: 30 October 1861
- In service: 30 October 1861
- Out of service: 19/20 December 1861
- Stricken: 1861 (est.)
- Fate: Sunk, 19/20 December 1861

General characteristics
- Tonnage: 318
- Propulsion: sail

USS Amazon was a wooden-hulled bark of 318 tons that had previously sailed as a whaler out of Fairhaven, Massachusetts.

During the beginning of the American Civil War, she was one of the older vessels and hulks chosen by the Union Navy to be sunk in selected waterways and harbors of the Confederate States of America in order to create underwater obstructions and hazards that could damage and prevent Confederate ships from attempting to "run" the Union blockade.

== Purchased in Massachusetts in 1861 ==
During the first year of the American Civil War, she was purchased for $3,675 by the Union Navy at Fairhaven, Massachusetts, on 30 October 1861, for the Stone Fleet.

== Assigned to the stone fleet ==
Amazon was to be laden with stone and sunk as an obstruction blocking the channel of Savannah, Georgia. She took on 325 tons of stone which had been purchased from nearby farms and sailed south on 20 November with the first contingent of stone whalers.

Upon her arrival at Savannah early in December, she found that the defenders of that port had themselves, already blocked the channels of the harbor with sunken hulks in the hope of barring the approach of a Northern invasion fleet.

Since the mission of the Yankee whalers at Savannah had already been carried out—albeit by Confederate forces -- Amazon and her sister ships moved to Charleston, South Carolina, where they were sunk across Charleston's main channel on 19 and 20 December 1861.
