= USS Potomac (1861) =

The second USS Potomac was an old whaler the United States Navy purchased on 1 November 1861. She was a part of the "Stone Fleet," a group of ships used to block the entrances to Confederate harbors during the American Civil War, and was sunk for this purpose on 9 January 1862.

The sinking of the "Stone Fleet" is memorialized in a poem of that name by Herman Melville. By coincidence, the log book of Potomac, kept by William Hussey Macy of Nantucket, Massachusetts, records Melville's desertion from the Fairhaven, Massachusetts whaler Achusnet in the Marquesas Islands in the entry for 4 July 1842. Melville's experiences in the Marquesas are the source of his novel Typee.

== See also ==
- Union Blockade
