= USS South America =

USS South America (1861) was a whaler purchased by the Union Navy on 9 November 1861 at New London, Connecticut. She was acquired to be sunk as an obstruction in the channel leading to a Confederate port as part of the Union blockade on ports and waterways of the Confederate States of America.

However, instead of duty in what was known as the "stone fleet", the 606-ton bark was beached with Peter Demill and Cossack on 8 December 1861 to serve as a wharf during the landing of troops at Tybee Island, Georgia, at the mouth of the Savannah River.

== See also ==
- Union blockade
