= USS Peri =

Coordinates: 32.745°N 79.827°W

USS Peri was one of the ships of the Stone Fleet, sunk in the harbor of Charleston, South Carolina as a blockade during the American Civil War.

Peri was purchased by the Union Navy at Portland, Maine on 29 November 1861 for the Stone Fleet. Intended to be sunk on 25 January 1862 as an obstruction in Maffit's Channel, Charleston Harbor, a gale on 24 January pushed her out to sea where she drifted for three days.

== See also ==
- Union blockade
