= USS Phoenix (1861) =

The Phoenix was a 404-ton American wooden whaler based in New London, Connecticut. The Union Navy purchased Phoenix at New London on 9 November 1861, at the start of the American Civil War. The Navy wanted her for the Stone Fleet, a group of vessels to be sunk in the channels of important Southern harbors to interrupt Confederate trade. She sailed on the 20th but grounded while crossing Savannah Bar, lost her rudder, and began leaking badly. When refloated she was beached as a breakwater to shelter Union troops landing on Tybee Island, Georgia, on or before 5 December 1861, in preparation for the Battle of Fort Pulaski.

== See also ==
- Union blockade
