= Annestown =

Village in County Waterford, Ireland

Annestown Bun Abha
- Village
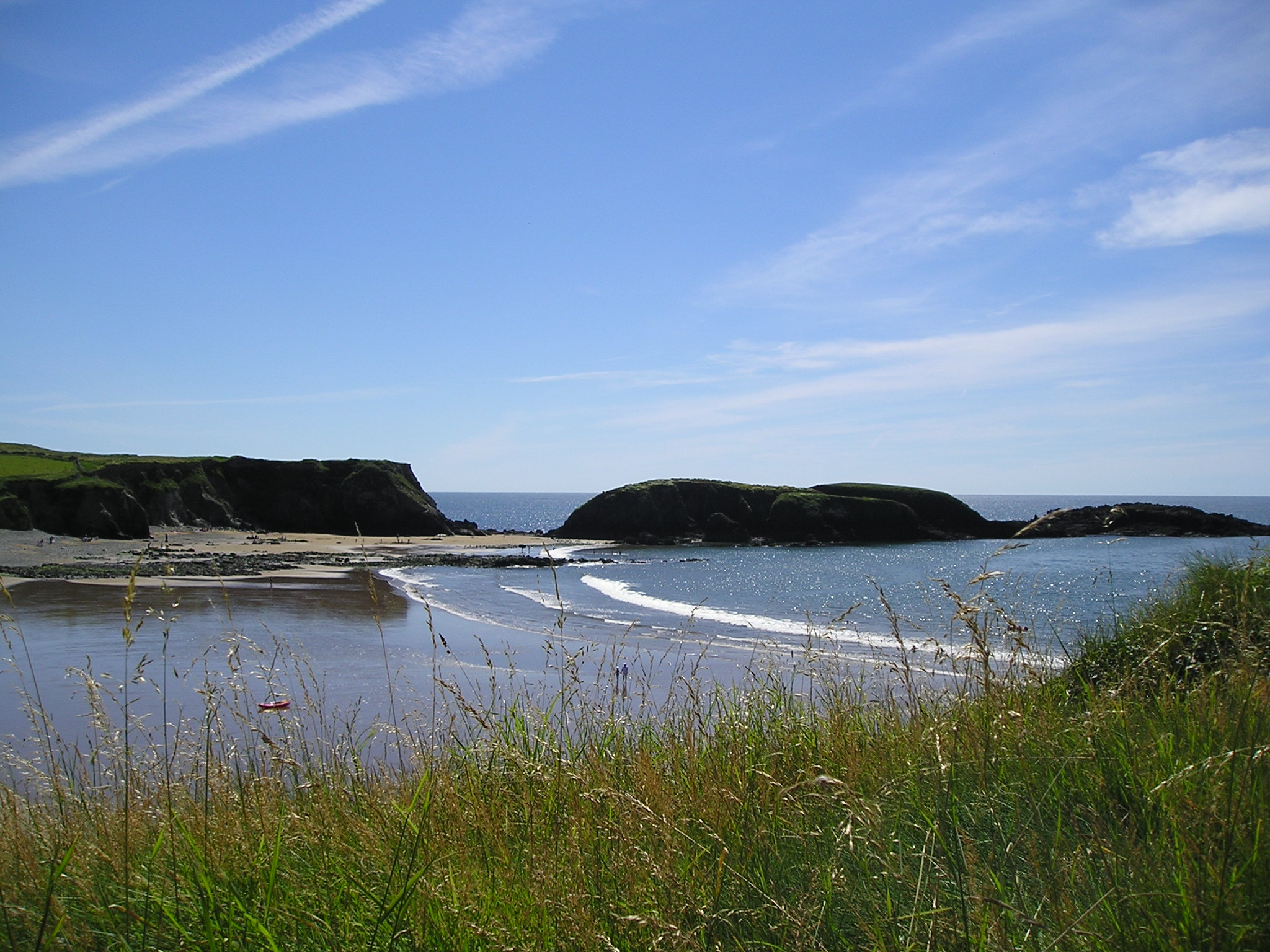
- A view of Annestown beach.

- Location in Ireland
- Coordinates: 52°08′29″N 7°16′37″W
- Country: Ireland
- Province: Munster
- County: County Waterford
- Time zone: UTC+0 (WET)
  - Summer (DST): UTC-1 (IST (WEST))

Annestown (Irish: Bun Abha, meaning 'river's end') is a coastal village in County Waterford, Ireland on the Copper Coast between Dungarvan and Tramore made up of around 25 cottages and houses built on a steep hill.

== Sports ==
It is a destination for surfers but only when there are large swells and waves as the cove has very shallow water. The town is also home to Seaview Celtic F.C. which is a small youth football club.

== See also ==
- List of towns and villages in Ireland
