= Charleston Harbor =

Harbor in the U.S. state of South Carolina

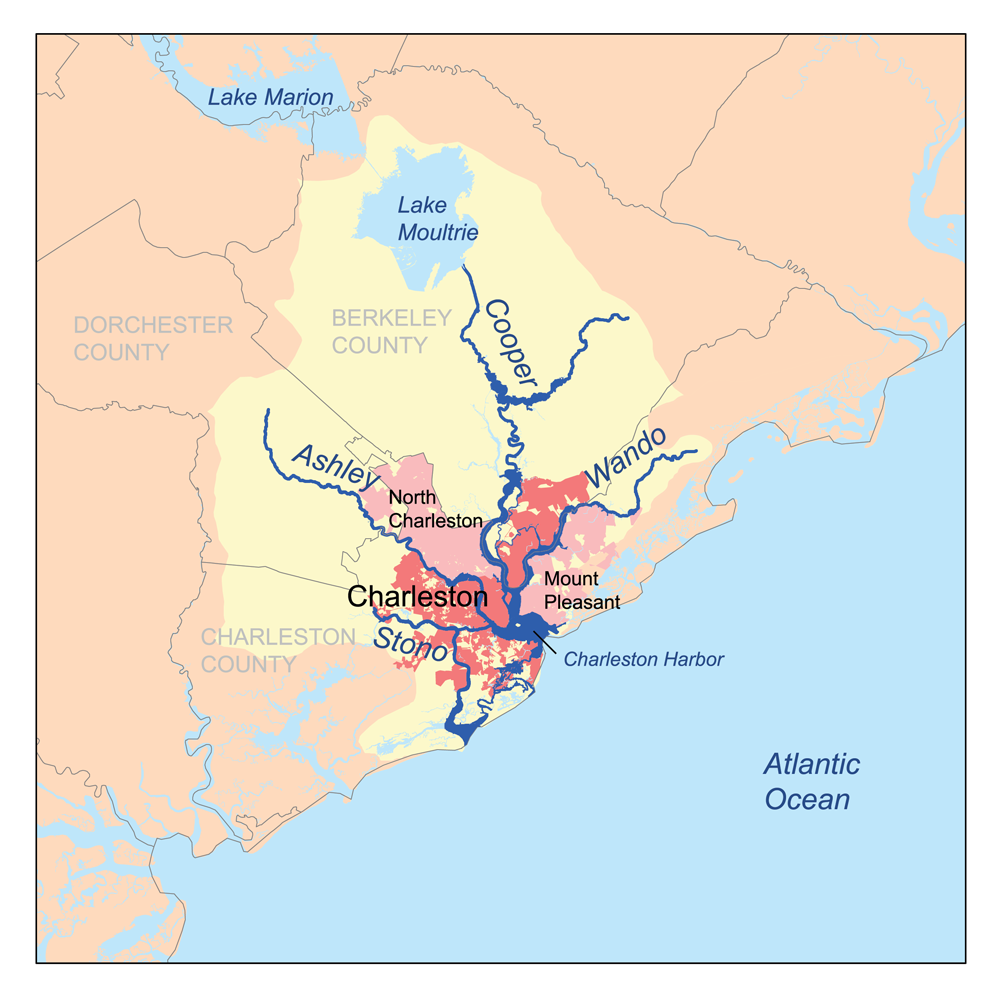
Map of the Charleston Harbor watershed.

The Charleston Harbor is an inlet (8 sq mi/20.7 km^{2}) of the Atlantic Ocean at Charleston, South Carolina. The inlet is formed by the junction of Ashley and Cooper rivers at 32°49′7.10″N 79°55′40.41″W. Morris and Sullivan's Islands shelter the entrance. Charleston Harbor forms part of the Intracoastal Waterway.

== History ==
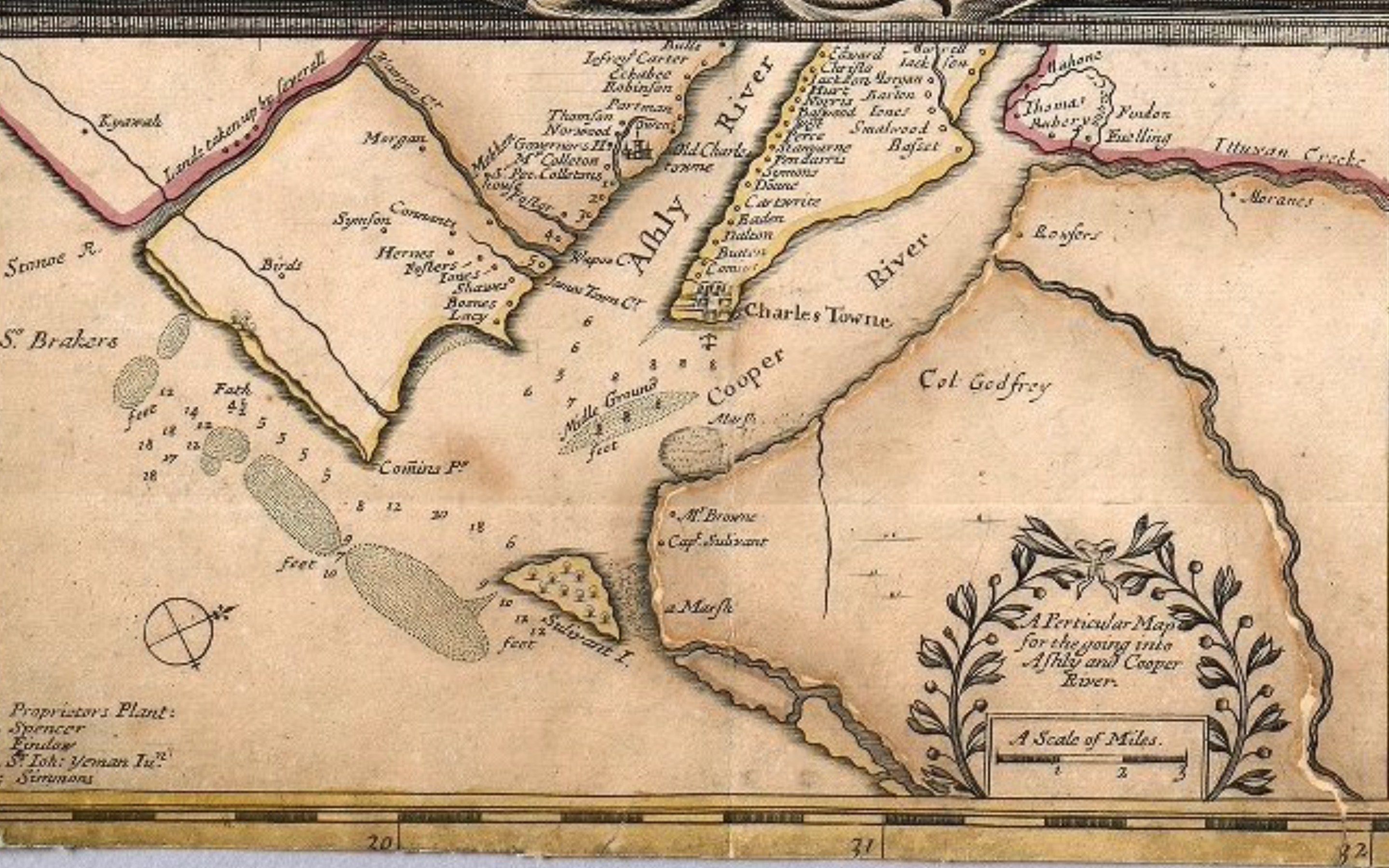
Map of Charleston Harbor in 1682

Charleston Harbor was a major port of entry for slave ships transporting slaves from West Africa. Due to its status as a slave capital, “Scholars estimate that over forty percent of all enslaved Africans sent to North America entered through Charleston Harbor — making Charleston the largest North American point of disembarkation for the trans-Atlantic slave trade.”

The harbor contains Fort Sumter, the site of the first shots of the American Civil War. Charleston Harbor was also the site of the first successful submarine attack in history on February 17, 1864, when the H.L. Hunley made a daring night attack on the USS Housatonic, during the American Civil War.

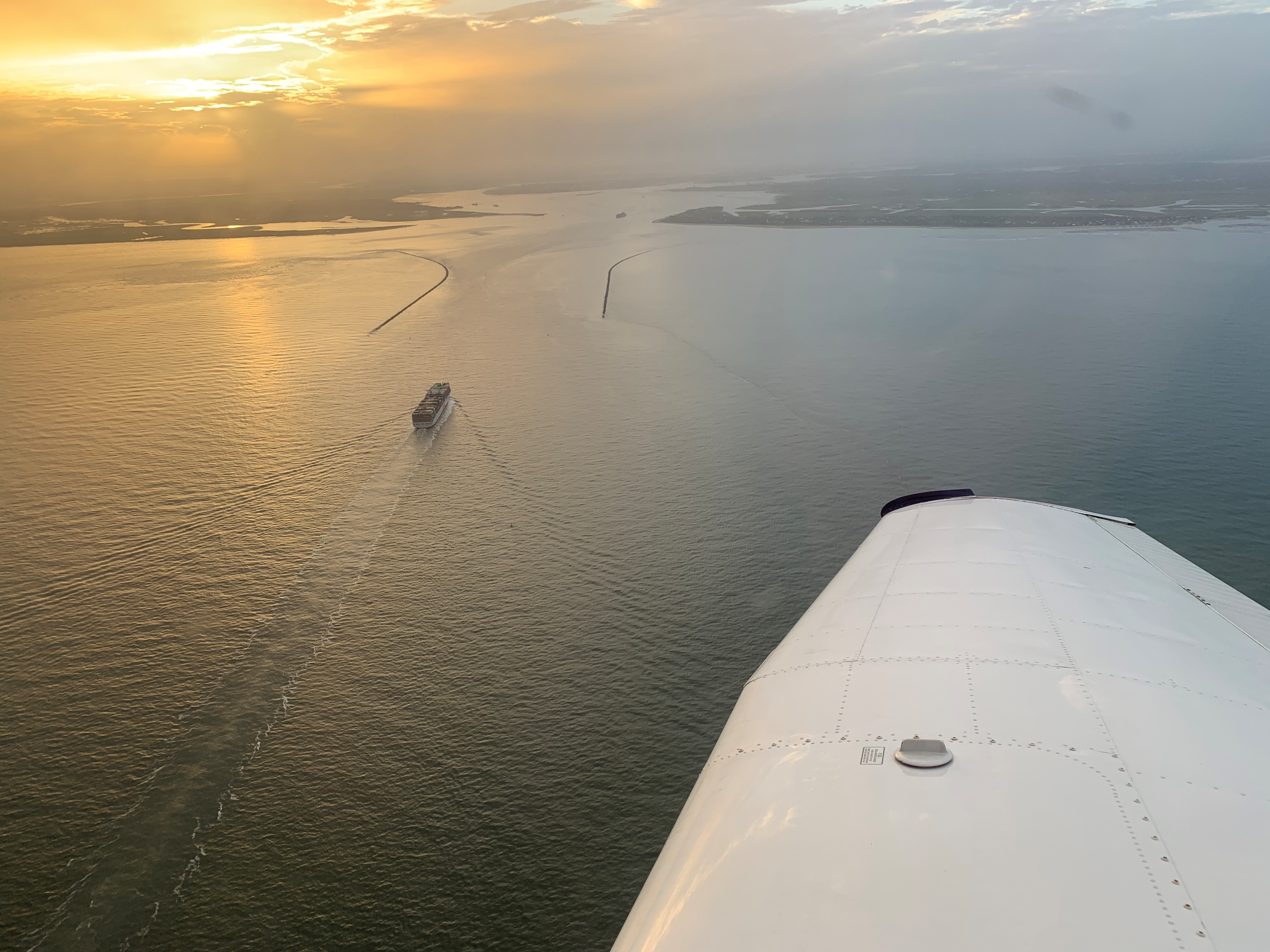
View of the Charleston Harbor Jetty from the Atlantic Ocean. The harbor can be seen in the distance.

The 12-foot natural depth of the harbor was a major reason for the establishment and growth of Charleston. The Rivers and Harbors Act of 1852 authorized the federal government to dredge the channels of the harbor to a depth of 17 feet. This deepening work was interrupted by the Civil War and was not completed until after the war's end. The jetties at the entrance to the harbor were constructed between 1878 and 1886.

== Transportation ==
The harbor includes public terminals owned and operated by the South Carolina Ports Authority, as well as private terminals. Existing federal channels are dredged to an authorized depth of 45 feet below mean lower low water. This depth is too shallow for Post-Panamax ships. The largest ships must carry less cargo, wait for favorable tide conditions, or combine these two approaches to reach port in Charleston. As of 2015, the U.S. Army Corps of Engineers began to design a deepening of the channels to 52 feet. The harbor deepening project was spurred on by the Panama Canal's recent expansion in an effort to handle the larger ships traveling from Panama without facing restrictions listed above. As of May 2017, the project will cost around $500 million, with $317.5 million federally allocated. Port officials plan to make the Charleston Harbor the deepest harbor on the East Coast by the end of the decade. Dredging of the harbor to 52 feet was officially completed on December 5, 2022.

== See also ==
- Charleston, South Carolina in the American Civil War
- Waterways forming and crossings of the Atlantic Intracoastal Waterway
- List of deepest natural harbours
