= List of shipwrecks of the United States =

This is a list of shipwrecks located in or around the United States of America.

== Alabama ==
Ship	Flag	Sunk date	Notes	Coordinates
American Diver	Confederate States Navy	February 1863	An experimental Confederate submarine that sank in Mobile Bay while under tow during a storm.	
Eliza Battle	United States	1 March 1858	A commercial steamboat that caught fire and sank in the Tombigbee River, and subsequently entered Alabama folklore as a ghost ship.	32.24359°N 88.01238°W
CSS Gaines	Confederate States Navy	5 August 1864	A Confederate side-wheel gunboat sunk in Mobile Bay after heavy damage during the Battle of Mobile Bay.	
CSS Huntsville	Confederate States Navy	12 April 1865	A Confederate ironclad warship scuttled in Spanish River to avoid capture.	30.76924°N 88.02053°W
USS Philippi	United States Navy	5 August 1864	A Union Navy side-wheel gunboat sunk in Mobile Bay after heavy damage during the Battle of Mobile Bay.	30.3835°N 88.0334°W
CSS Phoenix	Confederate States Navy	7 August 1864	A Confederate ironclad warship scuttled at Dog River.	30.60231°N 88.03860°W
USS Rodolph	United States Navy	1 April 1864	A Union stern-wheel tinclad minesweeper and gunboat sunk by a naval mine (called a "torpedo" at the time) in Mobile Bay.	
USS Tecumseh	United States Navy	5 August 1864	A Union monitor warship sunk by a naval mine (called a "torpedo" at the time) during the Battle of Mobile Bay.	30°13′54″N 88°1′33″W
CSS Tuscaloosa	Confederate States Navy	12 April 1865	A Confederate ironclad warship scuttled in Spanish River to avoid capture.	30.76924°N 88.02053°W

== Alaska ==
Ship	Flag	Sunk date	Notes	Coordinates
Alaska Ranger	United States	23 March 2008	A factory ship that flooded and sank off Unalaska.	53°53′N 169°58′W
Al-Ki		1 November 1917	A passenger steamer, wrecked on Point Augusta.	
Aleutian	United States	26 May 1929	A passenger steamer which sank after striking a submerged pinnacle rock.	57.48°N 153.84°E
Bear		1916	A passenger steamer, in surf broadside.	
Big Valley	United States	15 January 2005	A crabbing vessel that sank off Saint Paul Island.	
Borneo	United States	1819	American maritime fur trade ship wrecked at Prince of Wales Island near the Kaigani Haida village of Klinkwan (modern day Hydaburg). The crew left in boats and was picked up by Volunteer. In early 1819 a party from Volunteer investigated the wreck, finding it on the rocks, full of water, with hundreds of Haida on board or nearby, determined to repel any attempt to salvage anything.	
USC&GS Carlile P. Patterson	United States	11 December 1938	A research vessel that ran ashore in the Gulf of Alaska.	
City of Seattle		15 August 1912	A passenger steamer, brought ashore in Alaska.	
USS Coldbrook		16 June 1942	Also known as USS Colebrook; a Hog Islander merchant ship that grounded off Middleton Island.	
Destination		11 February 2017	A 98-foot (30 m) crabbing vessel that sank in 250 ft (76 m) of water amid icy conditions just northwest of St. George Island, Alaska in the Bering Sea. The captain and five crew members were lost with the boat.	
Eliza Anderson		March 1898	A steamboat that was abandoned and washed ashore at Dutch Harbor.	
Farallon	United States	5 January 1910	A passenger steamer, wrecked in the Cook Inlet.	
Feniks	Russia	1799	Russian-American Company ship Feniks (or Phoenix) lost at sea while sailing for Kodiak Island. Wreckage washed up from Unalaska Island to the Alexander Archipelago. Greatest maritime catastrophe in the history of Russian America. Loss of the largest Russian American ship, about 103 men, including passengers, Bishop Ioasaf, head of the Russian Ecclesiastical Mission in Alaska, and Captain James Shields. Financial loss of 622,328 rubles. This event greatly slowed the tempo of Russian colonization in America.	
USS Grunion	United States Navy	30 July 1942	Discovered in the Bering Sea in August 2007.	52°14′16″N 177°25′5″E
I-24	Imperial Japanese Navy	11 June 1943	A Type C submarine that was sunk by USS Larchmont near Shemya.	53°16′N 174°24′E
I-31	Imperial Japanese Navy	13 May 1943	A Type B1 submarine sunk by gunfire near Attu Island.	52.542°N 172.177°E
Islander	Canada	15 August 1901	A Canadian steamship sunk in Lynn Canal.	58.3765°N 134.7885°W
Jabez Howes			A three-masted full-rigged ship, wrecked in Chignik Bay. Wooden full-rigged ship owned by the Columbia River Packers Association and used as a cannery tender.	
Jessie		28 June 1898	Swamped in turbulent water at the mouth of the Kuskokwim River. 18 miners from the Columbia Exploration Company were believed to have been massacred by Yup'ik Natives or lost with wreck. One person, a trader called Ling, survived to bring word of the wreck to St. Michael. Jessie was towing the barge Minerva and a second unknown barge, which were both lost. Yup'ik Eskimos were said to have looted vessels.	
Kad'yak	Russia	2 April 1860	A merchant ship that struck a rock off Spruce Island. The wreck was rediscovered in 2003.	
Karluk	Russia	1830	Russian maritime fur trade vessel Karluk wrecked at Kodiak Island.	
Mariposa		18 November 1917	The vessel hit a reef on Strait Island, near Pt. Baker, while carrying 269 passengers and a full cargo of copper ore and canned salmon. The vessel had previously picked up the crew from the wrecked Al-Ki and the pirates from the wrecked Manhattan. All passengers and crew were rescued before vessel sank by Curaçao, Ravalli, and Jefferson. She went down with 25,000 cases of salmon and 1,200 tons of copper ore. The reef is now called Mariposa Reef.	
Mount McKinley		1942	A passenger steamer, beached near Scotch Cap, Aleutian Islands.	
Nenohi	Imperial Japanese Navy	5 July 1942	A Hatsuharu-class destroyer that was torpedoed by USS Triton off Agattu Island.	52°15′N 173°51′E
Neva	Russia	9 January 1813	The Russian-American Company (RAC) ship wrecked on a reef at Kruzof Island, killing 53 people, including Terentii Stepanovich Bornovolokov, who was to replace Alexander Baranov as Governor of the RAC. Total loss from the wreck over 250,000 rubles. Second gravest marine catastrophe in the history of Russian America, after the loss of Feniks in 1799.	
Nikolai I	Russia	1861	The Russian-American Company steamship wrecked near Admiralty Island.	
Nissan Maru	Imperial Japanese Navy	19 June 1942	Japanese armed freighter sunk by U.S. bomber aircraft in Kiska Harbor.	
Northern Belle	United States	20 April 2010	A fishing vessel that sank in the Gulf of Alaska.	
Oboro	Imperial Japanese Navy	17 October 1942	A Fubuki-class destroyer that was sunk by US aircraft northeast of Kiska.	52°17′N 178°08′E
Olga		1909	A whaling schooner wrecked near Nome, Alaska.	
Olympia	United States	10 December 1910	The steamship ran aground on Bligh Reef and sank without loss of life.	
Patterson		1938	A steam freighter, wrecked and aground at Cape Fairweather.	
Politkofsky		1915	A sidewheel steamer built by the Russian-American Company, completed 4,000 miles (6,400 km) before being abandoned in St. Michael near the entrance of the Yukon River.	
Portland		12 November 1910	A steamship which struck the rocks off Cordova.	
Princess Kathleen	Canada	7 September 1952	A passenger steamer, sunk near Point Lena. When she went aground at Point Lena rock, the vessel was one and a half miles (2.4 km) off course. She was the flagship of the Canadian Pacific Lines.	58.234°N 134.465°W
Princess Sophia	Canada	25 October 1918	A passenger liner sunk off Vanderbilt Reef near Juneau, with 343 lives lost.	58.6022°N 135.0236°W
Prinsendam	Netherlands	4 October 1980	A cruise ship that caught fire and sank off Baranof Island.	55.883°N 136.450°W
USS Rescuer	United States Navy	31 December 1942	A Rescuer-class rescue and salvage ship that was wrecked in the Aleutian Islands.	
USS S-27	United States Navy	19 June 1942	An S-class submarine that ran aground off Amchitka.	
Scandies Rose		31 December 2019 - 1 January 2020	The fishing vessel sunk on New Year's Day, 2020 after departing Dutch Harbor on 30 December 2019. Two crewmembers were hoisted from a life raft by a United States Coast Guard helicopter at about 2 a.m on New Year's Day. Five other crewmembers were reported missing.	
Selendang Ayu	Malaysia	8 December 2004	A cargo ship that ran aground off the coast of Unalaska Island, causing an oil spill.	
Sinsyo Maru	Japan	20 July 1784	The Japanese junk wrecked on Amchitka Island. The junk was sailing for Edo but damaged in a storm and drifted for over seven months before wrecking on Amchitka Island. With Aleuts and Russian promyshlenniki from another wrecked vessel, the group remained on the island for three years, building a new vessel from the wrecked ships. In September 1787 the survivors sailed to Petropavlovsk.	
Sv. Apostol Pavel	Russia	1785	Russian maritime fur trade vessel Sv. Apostol Pavel wrecked on Amchitka Island.	
Sv. Evpl	Russia	1785	Russian maritime fur trade vessel Sv. Evpl wrecked on Amlia Island.	
Sv. Ieremiya	Russia	1752	Russian maritime fur trade shitik Sv. Ieremiya wrecked on Adak Island.	
Sv. Petr	Russia	1750	Russian maritime fur trade shitik Sv. Petr wrecked on Attu Island. One person died.	
Sv. Troitsa	Russia	1764	Russian maritime fur trade vessel Sv. Troitsa wrecked on Umnak Island.	
Torrent	United States	15 July 1868	A wooden bark that foundered in a storm and went ashore in Cook Inlet.	
Tri Ierarkha	Russia	1796	Russian maritime fur trade galiot Tri Ierarkha wrecked in Cook Inlet.	
Tri Svyatitelya	Russia	1790	Russian maritime fur trade galiot Tri Svyatitelya, owned by Shelikhov-Golikov Company, sailed from Okhotsk for Kodiak Island with passenger Alexander Baranov, future governor of the Russian-American Company. Wrecked on Unalaska Island. With help from Aleuts Baranov and crew survived the winter then continued to Kodiak on native boats.	
Unknown Japanese vessel	Japan	1861	Japanese vessel of unknown name wrecked at Attu Island. Of the 12 crewmen, 9 died.	
Wakamiya-maru	Japan	1794	Japanese vessel wrecked at Biorka Island near Sitka. Had sailed from Sendai, Japan, making for Edo. Damaged in a storm and drifted to Biorka Island. Fifteen survivors were brought by Russians to Unalaska then Okhotsk.	
USS Wasmuth	United States Navy	29 December 1942	A Clemson-class destroyer sunk by her own depth charges in the Aleutian Islands.	
W. H. Dimond	United States	2 February 1914	The 390-ton three-masted barquentine was wrecked having run aground on Bird Island, Alaska, carrying general cargo from San Francisco to Unga Island.	

== Arizona ==
Ship	Flag	Sunk date	Notes	Coordinates
Charles H. Spencer	United States	1921	A steamboat that sank in a flood near Lee's Ferry.	

== Arkansas ==
Ship	Flag	Sunk date	Notes	Coordinates
Homer	United States	26 April 1864	A paddle steamer that was captured by the Union Army and scuttled at Camden.	
USS Linden	United States Navy	22 February 1864	A steamer sunk after striking a snag on the Arkansas River.	
USS Queen City	United States Navy	24 June 1864	A steamer blown up by Confederates after capture on the White River.	34.6934°N 91.3173°W

== Connecticut ==
Ship	Flag	Sunk date	Notes	Coordinates
USS Chewink	United States Navy	31 July 1947	Sunk off New London in 1947.	
Elmer S. Dailey	United States	1974	A wooden barge that sank in Bridgeport Harbor.	41°10.42′N 73°11.14′W
USS G-2	United States Navy	30 July 1919	G-class submarine, sank at mooring near Niantic Bay.	
USS Guardfish	United States Navy	10 October 1961	A submarine sunk as target off New London.	
USS Mary Alice	United States Navy	5 October 1918	A patrol vessel that was accidentally rammed by USS O-13 off Penfield Reef Light.	
Priscilla Dailey	United States	1974	A wooden barge that sank in Bridgeport Harbor.	41°10.42′N 73°11.14′W

== Delaware ==
Ship	Flag	Sunk date	Notes	Coordinates
USS Cherokee	United States Navy	26 February 1918	A tugboat that foundered in a gale off Fenwick Island.	38.84°N 74.8°W
USS Gallup	United States Navy	21 February 1918	A minesweeper that ran aground at Cape Henlopen.	
Ice Boat No. 3	United States	5 February 1905	She was between the two breakwaters when Ice Boat No. 3's paddlewheels became jammed by ice, and, unable to manoeuvre, the vessel was dragged by the ice floes over the recently sunken barge Santiago, one of whose broken masts pierced the ice boat's hull below the waterline. Within minutes, water had extinguished Ice Boat No. 3's furnaces and the order was given to abandon ship. Unable to launch a lifeboat because of the surrounding ice, the crew were forced to leap for safety onto the ice floes, the ice boat sinking shortly thereafter, at about 6 am.	
USNS Mission San Francisco	United States	7 March 1957	A fleet oil tanker, collided with the Liberian freighter Elna II while passing New Castle, caught fire and exploded.	
Monroe	United States	30 January 1914	The ocean liner collided with Nantucket in the Atlantic Ocean 50 nautical miles (93 km) off the Delaware Capes and sank with the loss of 41 of the 140 people on board. Survivors were rescued by Nantucket.	

== Georgia ==
Ship	Flag	Sunk date	Notes	Coordinates
Carrier Dove	United States	3 March 1876	A medium clipper that ran aground near Tybee Island.	
CSS Chattahoochee	Confederate States Navy	17 April 1865	A Confederate gunboat that had sunk on the Appalachicola River in Florida when its boiler had exploded, then been raised and returned to Columbus for repairs. She was scuttled in the Chattahoochee River to prevent her capture by Union troops.	
CSS Georgia	Confederate States Navy	21 December 1864	A Civil War ironclad floating battery scuttled off Savannah.	32°5′5″N 81°2′9″W
Golden Ray	Marshall Islands	18 September 2019	A car carrier that capsized in St. Simons Sound. Scrapping operations were completed October 2021.	
CSS Muscogee	Confederate States Navy	April 1865	A Confederate ironclad ram that was burned and scuttled in the Chattahoochee River near Columbus.	
USS Noble	United States Navy	1862	A bark that was scuttled as a blockship near Savannah.	
USS Phoenix	United States Navy	5 December 1861	A whaler that was scuttled as a breakwater off Tybee Island.	
Rattlesnake	Confederate States	28 February 1863	A Confederate privateer sunk by USS Montauk in the Ogeechee River.	
Republic	United States	25 October 1865	Sank in a hurricane about 100 miles (160 km) southeast of Savannah.	
USS South America	United States Navy	8 December 1861	A whaler that was beached at Tybee Island.	
USS Water Witch	United States Navy	19 December 1864	A sidewheel gunboat burned to avoid capture at White Bluff.	

== Guam ==
Ship	Flag	Sunk date	Notes	Coordinates
Aratama Maru	Imperial Japanese Navy	1944	An Imperial Japanese Navy transport sunk in Talofofo Bay.	
SMS Cormoran	Imperial German Navy	7 April 1917	A German steamer scuttled in Apra Harbor to avoid capture at the start of American involvement in World War I.	13°27′33″N 144°39′15″E
Kitsugawa Maru	Japan		A Japanese merchant freighter sunk by torpedo in Apra Harbor.	
Tokai Maru	Imperial Japanese Navy	1943	An Imperial Japanese Navy armed transport sunk in Apra Harbor.	

== Hawaii ==
Ship	Flag	Sunk date	Notes	Coordinates
USS Arizona	United States Navy	7 December 1941	A battleship lost in the Japanese bombing of Pearl Harbor.	21.364775°N 157.950112°W
USS Barbero	United States Navy	7 October 1964	A Balao-class submarine sunk as a target off Pearl Harbor.	
Bering	Russia	January 1815	The Russian-American Company ship (also spelled Behring; formerly Atahualpa, an American maritime fur trade vessel) wrecked at Waimea Bay, Oahu.	
USS Carbonero	United States Navy	27 April 1975	A Balao-class submarine sunk as a target.	
Carrier Dove	United States	21 November 1921	A schooner that struck a reef off Molokai.	
Carthaginian II	United States	December 2005	A sailing boat that was sunk as an artificial reef.	20°51′45.8″N 156°40′30.7″W
Cleopatra's Barge	Hawaii	6 April 1824	The royal yacht of King Kamehameha II that ran aground in Hanalei Bay.	
USS Darter	United States Navy	7 January 1992	A submarine that was disabled in a collision with Kansas Getty, and sunk as a target off Pearl Harbor.	
Ehime Maru	Japan	9 February 2001	A Japanese fishery high school training ship sank about 9 nautical miles (17 km) off the south coast of Oahu, after a collision with United States Navy submarine USS Greeneville. Nine of its crewmembers were killed, including four high school students.	
I-18	Imperial Japanese Navy		A Japanese midget submarine depth-charged at Pearl Harbor.	
I-401	Imperial Japanese Navy	31 May 1946	An I-400-class submarine that was sunk as a target off Kalaeloa.	
Kad’yak	Russia	1816	The Russian-American Company ship (also spelled Kad’iak and Kodiak; formerly Myrtle), wrecked at Honolulu Harbor, Oahu.	
USS LST-480	United States Navy	21 May 1944	A tank landing ship sunk following the West Loch Disaster in Pearl Harbor.	
USNS Mission San Miguel	United States	8 October 1957	A fleet oiler run aground on Maro Reef.	
USS S-28	United States Navy	4 July 1944	An S-class submarine that sunk off Oahu.	
USS Saginaw	United States Navy	29 October 1870	A sloop-of-war that ran aground off Kure Atoll.	
San Pedro		1996	Sunk by Atlantis Submarines Hawaii as an artificial reef.	
Sea Tiger	China	1999	Sea Tiger was a 168-foot (51 m)-long former Chinese trading vessel originally named Yun Fong Seong No. 303. It was confiscated in the early 1990s for carrying 90+ illegal immigrants into the state of Hawaii. Purchased by Voyager Submarines, then cleaned up and sunk in 1999 as part of a dive enrichment effort.	21°16′14.56″N 157°50′18.96″W
USS Stickleback	United States Navy	29 May 1958	A Balao-class submarine sunk in a collision with USS Silverstein.	
USS Tinosa	United States Navy	November 1960	A Gato-class submarine that was scuttled after being used as an anti-submarine warfare target.	
USS Utah	United States Navy	7 December 1941	A former battleship converted to a training and target ship lost in the Japanese bombing of Pearl Harbor.	21°22′8″N 157°57′45″W
YO-257	United States Navy	1989	Sunk by Atlantis Submarines Hawaii as an artificial reef.	

== Indiana ==
Ship	Flag	Sunk date	Notes	Coordinates
Lucy Walker	United States	23 October 1844	Sank in the Ohio River near New Albany.	

== Kansas ==
Ship	Flag	Sunk date	Notes	Coordinates
Arabia	United States	5 September 1856	A steamboat that sank in the Missouri River. The wreck now lies under a field in Kansas City.	39°10′24.97″N 94°40′12.89″W

== Kentucky ==
Ship	Flag	Sunk date	Notes	Coordinates
Commercial Dixie	United States	1990s	Originally an Admirable-class minesweeper (USS Fixity) that was decommissioned and later sank in the Ohio River at Maysville.	38.6452°N 83.7391°W

== Louisiana ==
Ship	Flag	Sunk date	Notes	Coordinates
CSS Arkansas	Confederate States Navy	5 August 1862	A Confederate ironclad ram that was destroyed by her crew on 5 August 1862, near Baton Rouge, Louisiana.	30°29′14″N 91°12′5″W
USS Carolina	United States Navy	27 December 1814	A schooner sunk by British forces near New Orleans.	
USS Covington	United States Navy	5 May 1864	A gunboat that was scuttled to prevent capture off Alexandria.	
El Cazador	Spain	1784	A Spanish brig carrying silver currency, sank 50 miles (80 km) south of New Orleans, discovered by a fishing trawler in 1993.	
El Nuevo Constante	Spain	September 1766	A merchant ship that ran aground after taking damage during a hurricane. The wreck was rediscovered in 1979.	29°34.837′N 92°39.299′W
CSS Governor Moore	Confederate States Navy	24 April 1862	A gunboat that took heavy damage in the Battle of Forts Jackson and St. Philip and was scuttled to prevent capture.	
Kentucky		June 1865	A riverboat that ran aground near Shreveport on the Red River while carrying a large number of Confederate soldiers. Not believed to be in danger, the ship was not evacuated. The ship sank at night taking approximately 200 lives. The wreck was rediscovered in 1994.	
Joe Webre	United States	2 October 1893	A steamship lost in the 1893 Cheniere Caminada hurricane.	
USS Lancaster	United States Navy	25 March 1863	A steamboat that was sunk by Confederate forces off Port Hudson.	
CSS Louisiana	Confederate States Navy	28 April 1862	An ironclad that burned, exploded, and sunk near Fort St. Philip on the Mississippi River.	29°21′48″N 89°27′41″W
CSS Manassas	Confederate States Navy	24 April 1862	An ironclad warship that was run aground by USS Mississippi in the Battle of Forts Jackson and St. Philip.	
CSS McRae	Confederate States Navy	28 April 1862	A gunboat that took heavy damage in a battle with USS Iroquois, and was scuttled off Algiers.	
MTC-602		9 September 1965	A barge that sank in the Mississippi River during Hurricane Betsy. The barge was raised on 12 November 1965.	
New York		7 September 1846	Sunk in a hurricane off the coast while carrying $40,000 in gold and silver. 17 people out of 53 passengers/crew perished.	
Robert E. Lee	United States	30 July 1942	A passenger freighter torpedoed by U-166.	
USS Signal	United States Navy	19 April 1864	A gunboat that was scuttled to prevent capture off Alexandria.	
U-166	Kriegsmarine	30 July 1942	A German U-boat sunk by a depth charge from a US Navy patrol boat.	28°37′N 90°45′W
USS Varuna	United States Navy	24 April 1862	A steamship that sank in the Battle of Forts Jackson and St. Philip.	
USCGC White Alder	United States Coast Guard	7 December 1968	A coastal buoy tender sunk in the Mississippi River near White Castle following a collision.	

== Maine ==
Ship	Flag	Sunk date	Notes	Coordinates
Alice E. Clark		1 July 1909	A four-masted schooner, struck Islesboro Ledge (off Islesboro, Penobscot Bay) in fog.	
Amaretto		1 July 1985	A fishing vessel, sunk by pirates two miles (3.2 km) off the coast of Owls Head.	
Annie C. Maguire	United Kingdom	24 December 1886	A barque that ran aground at Portland Head Light.	43.62283°N 70.20799°W
USS Eagle Boat 56	United States Navy	23 April 1945	An Eagle-class patrol craft that was sunk by U-853 off Cape Elizabeth.	43.5577°N 70.1621°W
Edward J. Lawrence	United States	26 December 1925	Last surviving six-masted schooner that sank off Portland after shipboard fire while moored.	
Georgia	Canada	January 1875	A Canadian screw steamer - formerly of the Confederate States Navy.	
Mary Barrett			A 241-foot (73 m) five-masted schooner built at Bath in 1901. It was intentionally sunk at Robinhood Cove in Georgetown. Known locally as Mary Barrett's Bones.	43.844612°N 69.732199°W
Nottingham	Great Britain	11 December 1710	A British galley which struck rocks and sank near Boon Island.	
USS S-21	United States Navy	23 March 1945	An S-class submarine that was sunk as a target.	

== Maryland ==
Ship	Flag	Sunk date	Notes	Coordinates
USS Blenny	United States Navy	7 June 1989	A Balao-class submarine that was scuttled as an artificial reef off Ocean City, Maryland.	
USS Cherokee, (a.k.a. "The Gunboat")	United States Navy	26 February 1918	Built in New Jersey in 1891, and initially named Edgar F. Luckenbach. Cherokee spent a year in the service of the U.S. Navy. In February 1918, she foundered off Fenwick Island lightship during a gale while en route to Washington, D.C.	38.84°N 74.8°W
Governor R. M. McLane	United States		Maryland state steamer, 1884–1945, serving in State Oyster Police Force during Oyster Wars and as State Fishery Force "flagship" and briefly commissioned in U.S. Navy during WW I then the state until 1945 that sunk in Baltimore harbor.	39.274528°N 76.600057°W
The Mallows Bay wrecks			Includes as many as 152 World War I-era merchant ships abandoned after the salvage company went bankrupt.	
U-1105	Kriegsmarine	19 September 1949	A Type VII-C/41 U-boat that was wrecked off Piney Point.	38°08′10″N 76°33′10″W

== Michigan ==
Ship	Flag	Sunk date	Notes	Coordinates
Alpena	United States	15 October 1880	A sidewheel steamer built by Thomas Arnold of Gallagher & Company at Marine City, Michigan in 1866. She was operated by the Goodrich Line after being purchased from Gardner, Ward & Gallagher in April 1868. Alpena sank in Lake Michigan in the "Big Blow" storm on October 15, 1880, with the loss of all 80 on board	
USS Althea	United States Navy	12 March 1920	A former pleasure cruiser/patrol craft that was sunk by ice off Detroit.	
Cyprus	United States	11 October 1907	The lake freighter sank during a storm on Lake Superior. The ship went down in 460 feet (140 m) of water about 7 nautical miles (13 km) north of Deer Park in Luce County. All but one of the 23 members of the crew perished.	46.79°N 85.60°W
Quincy Dredge Number Two	United States	1967	A dredge that sank in Torch Lake.	47°8′39″N 88°27′35″W
Three Brothers	United States	27 September 1911	She was carrying a load of hardwood worth of $4,200 from Boyne City to Chicago. After leaving Boyne City the vessel was sailing in heavy weather, and the hull began to leak more than usual. In order to save the vessel the captain elected to drive the vessel ashore on South Manitou Island, where she landed just 200 yards (180 m) east of the lifesaving station	

== Minnesota ==
Ship	Flag	Sunk date	Notes	Coordinates
Amboy	United States	28 November 1905		47°28′41″N 90°59′59″W
Andy Gibson	United States		Retired Mississippi River steamboat that eventually sank, still in a drydock cradle.	46°32′25″N 93°43′01″W
Benjamin Noble	United States	29 April 1914		46°56′0″N 91°40′0″W
Essayons	United States	23 March 2009	The laid up tug flooded and sank after being neglected for several decades at the Duluth Timber Company slip inside Duluth Harbor. Her engine is on display at the Lake Superior Maritime Visitor Center.	46°46′26″N 92°06′19.2″W
USS Essex	United States Navy	14 October 1931	A decommissioned U.S. Navy steam sloop that was scrapped and burned to the waterline outside Duluth Harbor. Her hull is the only surviving remnant of a vessel built by Donald McKay.	46°42′46″N 92°01′43″W
George Spencer	United States	28 November 1905		47°28′41″N 90°59′59″W
Hesper	United States	4 May 1905	The steamship sank off the coast of Silver Bay in Lake Superior in a late spring snowstorm.	47°16′17″N 91°16′18″W
Lafayette	United States	28 November 1905		
Madeira	United States	28 November 1905	The schooner barge was under the tow of the steamer William Edenborn when she was caught in a fierce storm with winds around 70 to 80 miles per hour (110 to 130 km/h), blowing snow onto the deck and kicking up huge swells. The tow line was cut loose and she crashed into a cliff called Gold Rock, near Beaver Bay, and sank. One life was lost.	47°12′22″N 91°21′29″W
May Flower	United States	2 June 1891	A scow schooner of an atypical design which capsized while carrying a load of sandstone blocks. One life was lost.	46°48′12″N 92°0′40″W
Niagara	United States	4 June 1904		46°56′45″N 91°46′16″W
Onoko	United States	15 September 1915	The first iron-hulled lake freighter that sank after she sprang a leak.	46°50′46″N 91°46′38″W
Robert Wallace	United States	17 November 1902	Wooden bulk freighter that foundered when her stern pipe burst. Whole crew was able to offload to the barge they were towing.	46°50′50″N 91°43′44″W
Samuel P. Ely	United States	30 October 1896		47°0′42″N 91°40′40″W
Wayzata Bay Wreck	United States	30 September 1879	Sunk by storm in Lake Minnetonka. Only complete model barge wreck in the United States.	44.9682°N 93.5158°W
Thomas Wilson	United States	7 June 1902	Whaleback freighter that sank outside the entrance to the Duluth harbor after colliding with another ship, prompting operational reforms. Her hatches were not yet closed because the weather was clear and calm.	46°47′0″N 92°4′10″W

== Mississippi ==
Ship	Flag	Sunk date	Notes	Coordinates
USS Baron DeKalb	United States Navy	13 July 1863	A City-class ironclad warship that was sunk by a naval mine near Yazoo City.	
USS Cairo	United States Navy	12 December 1862	A river gunboat that struck a naval mine in the Yazoo River. The wreck was raised in 1964 and is currently on display at Vicksburg National Military Park.	32°22′33″N 90°52′0″W
Josephine			A side-wheel steamer foundered off the barrier islands.	
USS Lily	United States Navy	28 May 1863	A tugboat that collided with USS Choctaw in the Yazoo River.	
USS Petrel	United States Navy	22 April 1864	A steamboat that was burned in the Yazoo River.	
Star of the West	Confederate States	March 1863	A steamship that was scuttled as a blockship near Greenwood.	

== Missouri ==
Ship	Flag	Sunk date	Notes	Coordinates
Far West	United States	October 1883	A steamboat that sunk near St. Charles on the Missouri River.	
USS Inaugural	United States Navy	1 August 1993	A decommissioned minesweeper, anchored at St. Louis as a floating museum from 1968 until the Great Flood of 1993. During the flood, the Inaugural was ripped from its moorings and carried a mile downstream, where it came to rest on its side, partially submerged, and where it remains to this day.	38.611483°N 90.188101°W
USS Mingo	United States Navy	November 1862	A steamboat that sunk off Cape Girardeau.	37.315°N 89.509°W
Montana	United States	22 June 1884	Large paddle wheeler, beached after collision with bridge near Bridgeton.	38°47′41″N 90°28′1″W
Nadine		10 September 1878	A steamboat built in 1872 that sank at the mouth of the Missouri River. Several lives lost.	
USS Naiad	United States Navy	1 June 1868	A steamboat that sank at Napoleon.	39.1332°N 94.0735°W
Saluda		9 April 1852	A steamship that exploded near Lexington.	

== Montana ==
Ship	Flag	Sunk date	Notes	Coordinates
Butte		1883	A steamboat that burned near Fort Peck on the Missouri River.	
Chippewa		10 May 1861	A steamboat built in 1859, that burned near the mouth of the Poplar River in the Missouri River.	
James D. Rankin		1877	A steamboat that wrecked on the Yellowstone River.	
Oakes		1892	A steamboat that sank in the North Fork of the Flathead River.	
Red Cloud		11 July 1882	A steamboat that sunk near the Red Cloud Bend of the Missouri River.	
Tacony		1870	A steamboat that was deliberately sunk near Fort Peck on the Missouri River. Part of the hull was pulled up in 1935 during the construction of the Fort Peck Dam.	
Yellowstone		1867	A steamboat that sank in the Yellowstone River.	

== Nebraska ==
Ship	Flag	Sunk date	Notes	Coordinates
Bertrand	United States	1 April 1865	A steamboat that sunk in the Desoto Bend of the Missouri River.	41°31′24″N 96°1′44″W
Pirate	United States	April 1839	A steamboat that sank in the Missouri River near Bellevue.	

== Nevada ==
Ship	Flag	Sunk date	Notes	Coordinates
Tahoe	United States	29 August 1940	A steamship that operated in Lake Tahoe at the turn of the 20th century. Scuttled in 1940, rediscovered in 2002, and added to the National Register of Historic Places in 2004.	

== New Hampshire ==
Ship	Flag	Sunk date	Notes	Coordinates
USS O-9	United States Navy	20 June 1941	An O-class submarine that sank off Portsmouth.	

== New Jersey ==
Ship	Flag	Sunk date	Notes	Coordinates
Adonis			Struck shore at Deal Beach.	
USS Algol	United States Navy	18 November 1991	An Andromeda-class attack cargo ship sunk as an artificial reef in Shark River.	40.1269°N 73.6564°W
Arundo	Netherlands	28 April 1942	Dutch cargo steamer of 5,163 tons built in 1930. When en route from New York for Table Bay and Durban she was torpedoed by U-136 and sunk. Six crew lost from a total crew of 43	40.17°N 73.68°W
Atlantus	United States	8 June 1926	Sank in a storm.	38°56′40″N 74°58′19″W
Ayuruoca			Sank in a collision.	
Beth Dee Bob			Foundered in a storm.	
Brunette			Sank in a collision.	
Carolina	United States	2 June 1918	A passenger liner sunk by U-151 off Atlantic City.	
Chappara			Struck a naval mine.	
Choapa			Sank in a collision.	
Delaware			Burned then sank under tow.	
Goulandris			Sank in a collision.	
Gulftrade			Torpedoed.	
USS Jacob Jones	United States Navy	28 February 1942	Sunk by a U-boat.	38°37′N 74°32′W
Lana Carol			Foundered off Manasquan Inlet.	
Malta			Ran aground near Belmar.	
Maurice Tracy			Sank in a collision.	
USRC Mohawk	United States Navy	1 October 1917	A revenue cutter that sank in a collision with Vennacher off Sandy Hook.	
USS Moonstone	United States Navy	16 October 1943	Sank in a collision with USS Greer off Cape May.	38.5008°N 74.111°W
Morro Castle	United States	8 September 1934	Caught fire off Long Beach Island.	
Park City			Sank in a collision.	
Persephone			Torpedoed.	
Pinta			Sank in a collision.	
Pliny			Ran aground on Deal Beach.	
Rjukan			Ran aground.	
USCS Robert J. Walker	United States Coast Guard	21 June 1860	A survey ship that served in the United States Coast Survey, a predecessor of the United States Coast and Geodetic Survey	
R.P. Resor	United States	28 February 1942	Torpedoed by U-578	
Rusland			Struck wreck of Adonis.	
San Saba			Struck a naval mine.	
Sindia		1901	Ran aground on the beach of Ocean City.	
USS St. Augustine	United States Navy	6 January 1944	A gunboat that was accidentally rammed by Camas Meadows off Cape May.	
Stolt Dagali			Sank in a collision.	
USS Tarantula	United States Navy	28 October 1918	A patrol boat that collided with Frisa off Fire Island.	
Tolten			Torpedoed.	
U-869	Kriegsmarine	11 February 1945	A German submarine thought to have been sunk near Gibraltar until its wreck was discovered off the coast of New Jersey in 1991.	39°19′48″N 73°12′00″W
Vega			Capsized under tow.	
Vizcaya			Sank in a collision.	
Washington Irving	United States	1 June 1926	A sidewheeler that collided with an oil barge on the North River and sunk off Jersey City.	
Western World	United Kingdom		Ran aground.	
HMS Zebra	Royal Navy	22 October 1778	A sloop-of-war that ran aground at Little Egg Harbor.	39.578°N 74.300°W

== New York ==
Ship	Flag	Sunk date	Notes	Coordinates
A.E. Vickery	United States	17 August 1889	A schooner that struck a reef near Rock Island Light.	44°16.820′N 76°01.183′W
USS Baldwin	United States Navy	5 June 1961	A Gleaves-class destroyer that ran aground near Montauk, and although recovered, was deemed not worth repairing, and subsequently scuttled.	
Bessie White		February 1922	A Canadian schooner, recently revealed by Superstorm Sandy on Fire Island (south of Long Island) lost in fog while transporting coal.	
Cadet			A steamboat that was wrecked in Lake George.	
USS California	United States Navy	19 July 1918	An armored cruiser sunk by a torpedo or mine near Fire Island.	40°32′15″N 73°2′13.92″W
Champlain II	United States	16 July 1875	A passenger steamboat ran aground by pilot under influence of morphine near Westport on Lake Champlain.	44°12′21″N 73°22′39″W
Charles R. Morse		1866	A schooner, went missing and suspected to have rammed the SS Oregon off Long Island.	
HMS Culloden	Royal Navy	23 January 1781	British ship that ran aground at Montauk during the American Revolution.	
John Jay (steamship)		29 July 1856	Tourism steamship caught fire and sank in Lake George	
Forward			A motor launch that was wrecked in Lake George.	
General Slocum	United States	15 June 1904	A steamboat that caught fire and sank near North Brother Island, with over 1,000 deaths.	
Glückauf	Germany	March 1893	An oil tanker that ran aground at Fire Island.	
Gwendoline Steers	United States	30 December 1962	A tugboat that sunk on the approach to Huntington Bay.	
Harold	United States	26 September 1903	The barge moved out of dock at the South Street Seaport in New York City with 7,700 silver and lead ingots, bound for American Smelting and Refining Company in Perth Amboy, New Jersey. The silver and the smelters belonged to the Guggenheim family. The barge sank, and was never recovered.	
Holland III	United States	November 1883	A prototype submarine built by John Philip Holland and stolen by the Fenian Brotherhood, who accidentally sunk it off Whitestone.	
HMS Hussar	Royal Navy	23 November 1780	A frigate that sank near Long Island Sound.	
USRC Jefferson	United States	15 December 1847	A cutter wrecked off Gardiners Point Island.	
John Milton	United States	6 December 1856	A ship that was wrecked in a snowstorm at Hampton Bays.	
Keystorm		26 October 1912	A steel freighter that struck Scow Island shoal.	44°25.777′N 75°49.350′W
Land Tortoise	Royal Navy	c. 1758	A radeau that was intentionally sunk in Lake George during the French and Indian Wars.	43°25′16″N 73°42′30″W
Lexington	United States	14 January 1840	A paddlewheel steamship which caught fire north of Long Island.	
HMS Liverpool	Royal Navy	11 February 1778	A Coventry-class frigate wrecked in Jamaica Bay.	40.5902°N 73.8545°W
Morania		29 October 1951	The result of a gasoline explosion that wrecked Penobscot as well. Closest shipwreck to the mouth of the Buffalo River	
Narragansett		11 June 1880	A passenger paddle steamer of the Stonington Line that burned and sank on 11 June 1880, after a collision with her sister ship Stonington in heavy fog at 23:30 in Long Island Sound. Approximately 50 passengers, but only one crewman, died.	
Nisbet Grammer	United Kingdom	31 May 1926	A British-built (by Cammell Laird & Company at Birkenhead, England in 1923) canaller, a steamship used to carry grain, coal and other products sunk after being hit by SS Dalwarnic off Somerset, New York. The ship was en route to Montreal from Buffalo, New York. All crew were saved and taken aboard Dalwarnic. Ship was named after one other co-owners of the ship.	
USS Ohio	United States Navy	1884	A ship of the line that burned in Greenport Harbor.	
Oregon	United Kingdom	6 March 1886	A passenger liner that was sunk off Long Island following a collision with a schooner believed to be the Charles R. Morse.	41.5167°N 71.7333°W
Rusland	Belgium	19 March 1877	The Belgian Red Star Line owned ocean liner ran aground at Long Island. All 125 passengers were taken ashore. There were attempts made to salvage ship, but it broke in two on 16 April and was declared a total loss.	
Roy A. Jodrey	Canada	20 November 1974	A bulk carrier that struck a buoy, then ran aground on Pullman Shoal near the United States Coast Guard Station at Wellesley Island.	44°19.923′N 75°56.010′W
USS Salmon	United States Navy	5 June 1993	A Sailfish-class submarine that was sunk as a target near Hudson Canyon.	40.4229°N 73.6811°W
Savannah	United States	5 November 1821	The first steamship to cross the Atlantic, before running aground off Long Island.	
Sea Bear		14 March 2015	A tug boat that sank off of Fire Island, New York, with loss of one of her four crew members.	
Ticonderoga		29 August 1901	Steamboat that sank after a fire on Lake George	
USS Spikefish	United States Navy	4 August 1964	A Balao-class submarine that was sunk as a target off Long Island.	
USS Turner	United States Navy	3 January 1944	A destroyer; exploded and sunk at Ambrose Light.	40°27′00″N 73°48′00″W
USS Verdi	United States Navy	31 July 1931	A patrol vessel that was wrecked off Watch Island.	
Vierge Marie		9 November 1854	A barque that came ashore carrying nuts from the Canary Islands and immigrants.	Between Amagansett and Montauk.
Washington	United States Navy	1 December 1917	A schooner that ran aground at the entrance to the Ambrose Channel.	
Wiawaka bateaux	Royal Navy	1758	The wrecks of seven British and colonial bateaux that were scuttled in Lake George in 1758.	

== North Dakota ==
Ship	Flag	Sunk date	Notes	Coordinates
Island City	United States	1864	A steamboat that sank near Fort Buford on the Missouri River.	
Rose Bud	United States	25 May 1880	A steamboat built in 1878, that sank in the Missouri River near Bismarck.	

== Ohio ==
Ship	Flag	Sunk date	Notes	Coordinates
USS Abeona	United States Navy	7 March 1872	The gunboat caught fire and was destroyed in the Ohio River at Cincinnati	
Anthony Wayne	United States	28 April 1850	A sidewheel steamer that sank after two of her boilers exploded.	
USS Carondelet	United States Navy	1873	Sank in the Ohio River during a flood.	38.687049°N 83.577544°W
Moselle	United States	25 April 1838	A riverboat that exploded off Cincinnati.	
W.R Stafford	United States		A sand dredge that was left abandoned in Sandusky.	41.46075°N 82.707917°W

== Pennsylvania ==
Ship	Flag	Sunk date	Notes	Coordinates
Elizabeth M	United States	9 January 2005	A towboat that sank in the Ohio River.	
Charles Foster			Sank off of Fairview, Pennsylvania, in Lake Erie.	42°10′N 80°15′W
Crete			Sank off of Erie, Pennsylvania, in Lake Erie.	42°10′N 80°00′W
Dean Richmond			Sank off of North East, Pennsylvania, in Lake Erie.	42°17′N 79°55′W
Eldorado			Sank off of Erie, Pennsylvania, in Lake Erie.	42°10′N 80°00′W
Indiana			Sank off of Harborcreek, Pennsylvania, in Lake Erie.	42°17′N 79°59′W
Mississippi III	United States	19 February 2010	A Sternwheel steamboat built in 1926. The vessel sank in the Ohio River off of Neville Island.	
Oneida			Sank off of North East, Pennsylvania, in Lake Erie.	42°13′N 79°51′W
Oxford			Sank near the U.S.-Canadian border in Lake Erie.	42°28′N 79°51′W
Philip D. Armour			Sank off of Erie, Pennsylvania, in Lake Erie.	42°07′N 80°10′W
USS Rush	United States Navy	8 December 1917	She was on a voyage from Boston, Massachusetts, to Philadelphia when she struck a submerged log at the entrance to the back channel of League Island Navy Yard and was wrecked. All hands were saved.	
S.K. Martin			Sank off of North East, Pennsylvania, in Lake Erie.	42°14′N 79°56′W

== Puerto Rico ==
Ship	Flag	Sunk date	Notes	Coordinates
Antonio López	Spain	1898	A transoceanic steamer belonging to the Compañía Transatlántica Española.	18°28′48″N 66°13′50″W

== Rhode Island ==
Ship	Flag	Sunk date	Notes	Coordinates
USS Bass	United States Navy	12 March 1945	V-boat scuttled off Block Island as a sonar target in 1945.	
Black Point		5 May 1945	A steel collier sunk by U-853 after World War II hostilities had ceased.	
HMS Cerberus	Royal Navy	5 August 1778	A frigate that was burnt in Narragansett Bay to prevent capture by the French, along with HMS Lark.	
USS Cero	United States Navy	21 October 1918	A patrol vessel that caught fire in Narragansett Bay.	
HMS Endeavour	Royal Navy	4 August 1778	British Royal Navy troop transport vessel previously commanded by James Cook on his first voyage of discovery. Scuttled as part of a blockade in Newport Harbor in 1778.	
USS G-1	United States Navy	21 June 1921	A G-class submarine that was sunk as a target in Narragansett Bay.	
HMS Gaspée	Royal Navy	9 June 1772	British customs ship burned and sunk by American patriots in the lead-up to the American Revolution.	
USS L-8	United States Navy	26 May 1926	A L-class submarine sunk in a navy torpedo test off Newport, three miles (4.8 km) south of Brenton Reef Light.	
HMS Lark	Royal Navy	5 August 1778	A Richmond-class frigate that was burnt in Narragansett Bay to prevent capture by the French, along with HMS Cerberus.	
USS Leyden	United States Navy	21 January 1903	A steamboat and tug that foundered off Block Island.	
HMS Liberty	Royal Navy	19 July 1769	A British ship that was burned by American colonists off Goat Island.	
USS Sealion	United States Navy	8 July 1978	A Balao-class submarine that was sunk as a target off Newport.	
USS Snowden	United States Navy	27 June 1969	An Edsall-class destroyer escort that was sunk as a target off Newport.	
U-853	Kriegsmarine	6 May 1945	Sunk off Block Island by US Navy blimps' rockets.	41.217°N 71.450°W

== South Carolina ==
Ship	Flag	Sunk date	Notes	Coordinates
HMS Actaeon	Royal Navy	29 June 1776	Frigate burned at Charleston; reported as discovered by NUMA in 1981.	
USS Amazon	United States Navy	20 December 1861	A bark that was part of the Stone Fleet scuttled at Charleston Harbor.	
Anchor Wreck			Located near Myrtle Beach.	
USS American	United States Navy	20 December 1861	A bark that was part of the Stone Fleet scuttled at Charleston Harbor.	
CSS Charleston	Confederate States Navy	18 February 1865	An ironclad warship that was scuttled at Charleston to prevent capture.	32°47′29″N 79°55′21″W
Civil War Wreck			Located near Myrtle Beach.	
City of Richmond			Located near Myrtle Beach.	
USS Dixon	United States Navy	21 July 2003	A submarine tender that was sunk as a target off Charleston.	31°16′17.9″N 73°57′46.2″W
CSS Georgiana	Confederate States Navy	19 March 1863	Iron-hulled Confederate cruiser destroyed off Isle of Palms with cargo of munitions, medicines and merchandise then valued at over $1,000,000, while attempting to run past the federal blockade fleet into Charleston.	32°46′47″N 79°45′35″W
Governor		November 1861	A side wheel steamer used for federal transport, carrying a marine battalion of 600 under Major John G Reynolds. It sank off Georgetown after a gale and a hit from a rescue vessel. It foundered for three days. Seven men were killed.	
HEBE & St Cathan			Located near Myrtle Beach.	
USS Housatonic	United States Navy	17 February 1864	Sunk by CSS Hunley, becoming the first warship in history to be sunk by a submarine.	32°43′7″N 79°48′17″W
CSS H. L. Hunley	Confederate States Navy	17 February 1864	Sank three times in its eight-month career, sinking for the final time shortly after its attack on USS Housatonic. Placed on National Register of Historic Places in 1978.	32°44′N 79°46′W
USS Keokuk	United States Navy	8 April 1863	An experimental ironclad steamer, sunk in the First Battle of Charleston Harbor.	32°41′36″N 79°52′19″W
USS Kingfisher	United States Navy	28 March 1864	A bark that ran aground on the banks of the Combahee River.	
Mary Bowers	Confederate States	31 August 1864	Iron-hulled sidewheel steamer of 680 tons, stranded on the wreck of CSS Georgiana while attempting to run the federal blockade into Charleston.	32°46′47″N 79°45′35″W
USS Meteor	United States Navy	9 January 1862	A sailing ship that was part of the Stone Fleet scuttled at Charleston Harbor.	
USS New England	United States Navy	25 January 1862	A whaler that was part of the Stone Fleet scuttled at Charleston Harbor.	
Norseman	Confederate States		Iron-hulled propeller steamer, ran on wreck of CSS Georgiana and stranded one-half mile (0.80 km) inshore while attempting outbound run through the federal blockade of Charleston with a cargo of cotton. The vessel was owned by George Trenholm (aka the "real Rhett Butler").	
Ozama	United States	23 November 1894	An American steamer that ran aground on the shoals at Cape Romain. The wreck was rediscovered in 2013.	
USS Patapsco	United States Navy	15 January 1865	Struck a naval mine at Charleston.	32.765252°N 79.891281°W
USS Peri	United States Navy	25 January 1862	A ship of the Stone Fleet scuttled at Charleston Harbor.	
Pipe Wreck			Located near Myrtle Beach.	
USS Potomac	United States Navy	9 January 1862	A whaler that was part of the Stone Fleet scuttled at Charleston Harbor.	
Raccoon	Confederate States		Blockade runner at Charleston.	
USS Rebecca Sims	United States Navy	20 December 1861	A whaler that was part of the Stone Fleet scuttled at Charleston Harbor.	
USS Robin Hood	United States Navy	20 December 1861	A ship that was part of the Stone Fleet scuttled at Charleston Harbor.	
Ruby	Confederate States		Blockade runner run aground at Folly Island, Charleston.	
USS Stephen Young	United States Navy	25 January 1862	A brig that was part of the Stone Fleet scuttled at Charleston Harbor.	
Stonewall Jackson	Confederate States		Blockade runner grounded and burned at Isle of Palms, Charleston.	
USS Tenedos	United States Navy	20 December 1861	A bark that was part of the Stone Fleet scuttled at Charleston Harbor.	
USS Timor	United States Navy	26 January 1862	A ship that was part of the Stone Fleet scuttled at Charleston Harbor.	
United States	United States	3 April 1881	Wrecked off Cape Romain	
USS Vermilion	United States Navy	4 March 1988	A Tolland-class attack cargo ship that was sunk as an artificial reef off Myrtle Beach.	
USS Weehawken	United States Navy	6 December 1863	American Civil War monitor at Charleston.	32.7157°N 79.8903°W
William Lawrence	United States	February 1899	A cargo ship that was wrecked in a storm off Hilton Head Island.	

== South Dakota ==
Ship	Flag	Sunk date	Notes	Coordinates
Urilda	United States	24 April 1869	A steamboat that sank in the Kate Sweeney Bend of the Missouri River near Vermillion.	
Western	United States	29 March 1881	A steamboat that sank in the Missouri River near Yankton.	

== Tennessee ==
Ship	Flag	Sunk date	Notes	Coordinates
Chattanooga			A paddlewheel steamer that sank in the Tennessee River near Chattanooga.	
CSS Colonel Lovell	Confederate States Navy	6 June 1862	A cottonclad warship that was rammed by USS Queen of the West and USS Monarch in the First Battle of Memphis.	
Eclipse		27 January 1865	A Mississippi River steamboat that exploded near Johnsonville.	
M.E. Norman	United States Army	8 May 1925	A steamboat that sank near Memphis.	
Pennsylvania	United States	13 June 1858	A steamboat that sank near Memphis.	
Sultana	United States	27 April 1865	A Mississippi River paddlewheeler that exploded four miles (6.4 km) south of Memphis, killing an estimated 1,600 passengers.	35°11′26″N 90°6′52″W

== Texas ==
Ship	Flag	Sunk date	Notes	Coordinates
Anona		1944	A steam yacht sunk in the Viosca Knoll area.	
La Belle	France	1686	A barque-longue of French explorer La Salle's expedition, which ran aground in Matagorda Bay.	
City of Waco	United States	9 November 1875	The Mallory Line (New York) steamer sunk after a fire aboard off Galveston. 56 lives were lost.	
USS Elizabeth	United States Navy	15 November 1918	A patrol vessel that was wrecked at the mouth of the Brazos River.	
Grandcamp	France	16 April 1947	Accidental detonation of 2,300 tons of ammonium nitrate aboard this French-registered vessel killed 581 people in the Texas City disaster.	29°22′39″N 94°53′29″W
Gulfpenn		13 May 1942	A fuel tanker torpedoed by U-boat U-506.	
Hannah Elizabeth	United States	19 November 1835	Two-masted schooner sunk near Pass Cavallo.	
USS Hatteras	United States Navy	11 January 1863	A US Navy gunboat sunk by CSS Alabama off Galveston during the American Civil War.	
Heredia	United States	19 May 1942	A United Fruit Company freighter torpedoed by German submarine U-506.	
Mary			A steamship that ran aground at Aransas Pass.	
Nicaragua		16 October 1912	Ran aground on Padre Island.	26.69280°N 97.31820°W
Oaxaca	Mexico	26 July 1942	A Mexican freighter torpedoed by U-171 near Port O'Connor.	28°22′N 96°11′W
OMI Charger	United States	9 October 1993	An oil tanker that exploded near Galveston.	
San Esteban	Spain	29 April 1554	A Spanish cargo ship that was wrecked in a storm on the Padre Island sandbars. The wreck was discovered in 1970.	26°33.20′N 97°25.52′W
Selma	United States	19 March 1922	A concrete oil tanker scuttled off Pelican Island after running aground off Tampico, Mexico.	
Sheherezade			An oil tanker sunk by a torpedo.	

== Vermont ==
Ship	Flag	Sunk date	Notes	Coordinates
A.R. Noyes		17 October 1884	A standard canal boat that broke loose from tug at Proctor Shoal, Lake Champlain.	
General Butler	United States	9 December 1876	A sailing canal boat that hit breakwater near Burlington on Lake Champlain.	
O.J. Walker	United States	11 May 1895	A sailing canal boat sunk in a gale near Burlington.	
Phoenix	United States	4 September 1819	A steamer that caught fire near Colchester Shoal.	
Unknown horse ferry			The only known example of a horse-powered ferry on Lake Champlain, found in Burlington Bay.	
Water Witch	United States	26 April 1866	A schooner that foundered in a gale off Diamond Island.	

== Virginia ==
Ship	Flag	Sunk date	Notes	Coordinates
Amaganzette			Swamped.	
USAS American Mariner	United States	October 1966	A research vessel that was sunk as a target in Chesapeake Bay.	38°02′25″N 76°09′17″W
Anglo-African	United Kingdom	January 1909	Sunk off Cape Charles.	
USS Beale	United States Navy	24 June 1969	A Fletcher-class destroyer that was sunk as a target in Chesapeake Bay.	
USS Charles F. Hughes	United States Navy	26 March 1969	A Benson-class destroyer that was sunk as a target.	
USS Coos Bay	United States Navy	9 January 1968	A Barnegat-class seaplane tender that was sunk as a target.	
USS Cumberland	United States Navy	8 March 1862	A frigate that was rammed by CSS Virginia at Newport News.	36°57′42″N 76°25′54″W
USCGC Cuyahoga	United States Coast Guard	26 November 1978	Collided with Santa Cruz II off Smith Point. Raised and re-sunk as an artificial reef off the Virginia Capes.	
USS Despatch	United States Navy	10 October 1891	A steamship that was wrecked in a gale off Assateague Island.	37.9783°N 75.2467°W
Doxie Girl				
CSS Drewry	Confederate States Navy	24 January 1865	A gunboat that was wrecked in the Battle of Trent's Reach.	
Ethel C.				
Eureka	United States		Sank in a collision.	
CSS Florida	Confederate States Navy	28 November 1864	A cruiser that collided with USAT Alliance at Newport News.	37.0732°N 76.5431°W
Francis E. Powell			Torpedoed.	
CSS Fredericksburg	Confederate States Navy	4 April 1865	An ironclad warship that was scuttled in the James River to prevent capture.	
USS Guavina	United States Navy	14 November 1967	A Gato-class submarine that was sunk as a target off Cape Henry.	
Gulf Hustler			Swamped.	
USS Gyatt	United States Navy	11 June 1970	A Gearing-class destroyer that was sunk as a target.	
Hanks			Swamped.	
USS Henry Andrew	United States Navy	24 August 1862	A steamship that ran aground off Cape Henry.	
Ironsides	United States	29 August 1873	A steamship that was stranded at Hog Island.	37.4110°N 75.6607°W
CSS Jamestown	Confederate States Navy	15 May 1862	A steamship that was sunk as a blockship near Drewry's Bluff.	
John Morgan	United States	1 June 1943	Collided with Montana.	
USS John W. Weeks	United States Navy	19 November 1970	An Allen M. Sumner-class destroyer that was sunk as a target.	37°10.9′N 73°45.6′W
Juno	Spain	1802	Spanish ship lost in a storm; still owned by Spain according to a ruling of the Fourth Circuit (Virginia v. Spain).	
USS Katahdin	United States Navy	September 1909	An ironclad warship that was sunk as a target in Rappahannock River.	
Kingston Ceylonite			Torpedoed.	
La Galga	Spain	1750	Sank in a tropical cyclone; Spain claimed ownership to the wreck, but the Fourth Circuit (Virginia v. Spain) ruled that Spain had expressly abandoned it in 1763.	
Lillian Luckenbach			Sank in a collision.	
USS Manta	United States Navy	16 July 1969	A Balao-class submarine that was sunk as a target off Norfolk.	37.039°N 76.191°W
Marine Electric	United States	12 February 1983	A 605-foot (184 m) bulk carrier that sank 30 miles (48 km) east of Chincoteague. An investigation by the United States Coast Guard found that the ship had been in an un-seaworthy condition, and that many of its inspection reports had been faked.	
Merida	United States	13 May 1911	Collided with Admiral Farragut.	
USS Mona Island	United States Navy	1975	A repair ship that was scuttled as an artificial reef off Wachapreague.	
USS Moore	United States Navy	13 June 1975	An Edsall-class destroyer escort that was sunk as a target.	
Ocean Venture			Torpedoed.	
SMS Ostfriesland	Imperial German Navy	21 July 1921	A Helgoland-class battleship sunk as a target off Cape Hatteras.	37°09′08″N 74°34′03″W
USS R-8	United States Navy	19 August 1936	An R-class submarine sunk as a target off Cape Henry.	
Santore			Struck a naval mine.	
USS Saxis	United States Navy	7 July 1917	A patrol vessel that was wrecked off West Point.	
USS Scurry	United States Navy	14 August 1967	An Admirable-class minesweeper that was sunk as a target off the Virginia Capes.	
SeaBreeze	Panama	December 2000	A cruise ship that sank off the coast of Virginia.	36.9059°N 72.1472°W
USS Sumpter	United States Navy	24 June 1863	A steamship that sank in a collision near Smith Island.	37.0968°N 75.7040°W
USS Teaser	United States Navy	27 December 1918	A patrol vessel that caught fire in the Hampton Roads.	
USS Texas	United States Navy	21 March 1911	A pre-dreadnought battleship that was sunk as a target in Tangier Sound.	37°43′10″N 76°05′00″W
Tiger	United States	1 April 1942	Torpedoed by U-754 in Chesapeake Bay.	
USS Tills	United States Navy	3 April 1969	A Cannon-class destroyer escort that was sunk as a target.	
USCGC Unimak	United States Coast Guard	1988	A Casco-class cutter that was sunk as an artificial reef.	
Vestris	United Kingdom	12 November 1928	A steamship that sank in a storm off Norfolk.	37°38′N 70°23′W
CSS Virginia	Confederate States Navy	11 May 1862	An ironclad warship that was scuttled off Craney Island to prevent capture.	36°54′25″N 76°20′37″W
USS Washington	United States Navy	25 February 1924	An incomplete battleship; construction work ceased upon the signing of the Washington Naval Treaty in February 1922. The ship was ultimately sunk as a target.	
William D. Sanner			Collision in the Chesapeake Bay.	
Winthorp				
USS Witek	United States Navy	4 July 1969	A Gearing-class destroyer that was sunk as a target.	

== Wake Island ==
Ship	Flag	Sunk date	Notes	Coordinates
Dashing Wave	United Kingdom	31 August 1870	A British tea clipper that struck a reef and sank.	
Hayate	Imperial Japanese Navy	11 December 1941	A Japanese destroyer sunk by US Marines.	19°10′N 166°22′E
Kisaragi	Imperial Japanese Navy	11 December 1941	A Japanese destroyer sunk by US Marines.	18°55′N 166°17′E
Libelle	Bremen	4 March 1866	A German barque that shipwrecked on the eastern reef during a gale.	

== Washington ==
Ship	Flag	Sunk date	Notes	Coordinates
Admiral Sampson	United States	26 August 1914	A cargo liner that collided with Princess Victoria near Point No Point.	
Alice Gertrude	United States	11 January 1907	A steamboat that was wrecked in a snowstorm at the entrance to Clallam Bay.	
USS Bugara	United States Navy	1 June 1971	A Balao-class submarine that sunk under tow off Cape Flattery.	
Catala	Canada	1 January 1965	A steamship that ran aground in a storm in Grays Harbor.	46.943°N 124.112°W
Dix	United States	18 November 1906	A steamboat that collided with Jeanie off Duwamish Head.	
Dode	United States	20 July 1910	A steamboat that struck a rock off Marrowstone Island.	
Falcon	United States	after June 1919	A launch that sank for unknown reasons in Lake Washington, off Kirkland. The wreck was discovered in 2006.	
USS General M. C. Meigs	United States Navy	9 January 1972	A General John Pope-class troop transport that ran aground under tow in a storm.	48.286095°N 124.687566°W
Governor	United States	1 April 1921	A coastal steamship built in 1907 by New York Shipbuilding Corporation that sank after being struck by USSB West Hartland during foggy weather at Puget Sound.	
Great Republic	United States	19 April 1879	An American steamboat accidentally run aground on sand and subsequently destroyed by waves near the mouth of the Columbia River.	46.278°N 124.024°W
Grundl		15 September 1968	A 50-foot (15 m) yacht capsized and sank when hit by a 35-foot (11 m) at Grays Harbor Bar. Three people were killed with one survivor.	
Healys-1	United States	Unknown	Originally a YMS-1-class minesweeper (USS YMS-416) that was decommissioned and later sank in Lake Washington.	
Hector	United States	April 1913	A tugboat that sank after an internal explosion off Purdy Spit.	
Hojunmaru	Japan	1834	Japanese junk that was sailing for Edo, but damaged and drifted for over a year before wrecking near Cape Flattery. Only three survived: Iwakichi (28 years old), Kyukichi (15), and Otokichi (14).	
Isabella	United Kingdom	1830	A Hudson's Bay Company British supply ship. Remains are in 40 feet (12 m) of water off Cape Disappointment near Astoria. Site is listed in the National Register of Historic Places by the National Park Service.	
Lamut	Soviet Union	31 March 1943	A Russian steamship that ran aground south of Cape Flattery during a violent storm.	
Leona	United States	1912	A steamship that burned on the Lewis River near La Center.	
USS Memphis	United States Navy	13 May 1883	A steamship that caught fire at Seattle.	47.620°N 122.377°W
North Pacific	United States	18 July 1903	A steamboat that ran aground off Marrowstone Point Light.	
Pacific	United States	6 November 1875	The paddle steamer sank after being in collision with Orpheus off Cape Flattery. At least 318 lives lost.	
Sv. Nikolai	Russia	1 November 1808	Russian-American Company schooner, sailed south from Sitka to locate a suitable site for a permanent post in Oregon Country. Wrecked on the Olympic Peninsula near Rialto Beach. The crew was marooned for about 18 months, clashing with the Hoh then enslaved by the Makah. They were rescued in May 1810 at Neah Bay by the American merchant vessel Lydia.	
T.W. Lake	United States	5 December 1923	A steamboat that foundered off Lopez Island.	
Yosemite	United States	9 July 1909	A steamboat that was wrecked at Port Orchard Narrows.	

== Wisconsin ==
Ship	Flag	Sunk date	Notes	Coordinates
Appomattox	United States	2 November 1905	The wooden steamship went aground in smoke and fog on the Wisconsin coast of Lake Michigan, near Milwaukee in 1905. Crews worked for two weeks in an effort to free the ship, but eventually it broke up, and was abandoned as a total constructive loss.	
Atlanta	United States	18 March 1906	Steamer from the Goodrich line that caught fire and burned 10 nautical miles (19 km) northeast of Port Washington in Lake Michigan. Captain Delos H. Smith rescued 74 of 75 from the burning ship.	
Daniel Lyons	United States	18 October 1878	The schooner was in collision with schooner Kate Gillett off Algoma in Lake Michigan. There was no loss of life	
Fleetwing	United States	26 September 1888	Ran aground and sunk in Lake Michigan.	
Frank O'Connor	United States	3 October 1919	A bulk carrier that sank in Lake Michigan off the coast of North Bay, Door County, Wisconsin	
Grape Shot	United States	November 1867	A schooner that was run aground by a gale off the coast of Plum Island. There were no casualties.	
Hanover	United States	November 1867	A schooner that struck a shoal near the Strawberry Islands	
Hetty Taylor	United States	26 August 1880	She was a schooner that encountered a squall and sank in Lake Michigan off the coast of Sheboygan, Wisconsin. In 2005, the shipwreck site was added to the National Register of Historic Places. There were no casualties.	
Joys	United States	23 December 1898	She was at anchor in the Sturgeon Bay Ship Canal. At about 1:00 a.m., the captain saw flames from the wheelhouse and sounded the alarm. The crew was able to escape, but in the ensuing chaos the ship was carried in the current toward the canal office and government warehouse. Eventually, efforts from those on land were successful in towing the vessel away from land, where it then burned to the waterline and sank.	
L. R. Doty	United States	October 1898	Largest wooden steamship on the Great Lakes, sunk in a storm with no survivors. Its wreck was located in June 2010.	
Louisiana	United States	1913	Burned in a gale.	
Lucerne	United States	17/18 November 1886	The commercial schooner sank with all hands due to bad weather in Lake Superior, off the coast of Long Island in Chequamegon Bay. The site of the wreck was added to the National Register of Historic Places in 1991.	
Marquette	United States	15 October 1903	While about 5 nautical miles (9.3 km) East of Michigan Island and carrying a cargo of iron ore, she sprang a leak and began to sink. The crew escaped in lifeboats.	
Milwaukee	United States	22 October 1929	Sunk in Lake Michigan from storm damage.	43°08′11″N 87°49′55″W
Moonlight	United States	13 September 1903	She sank in a storm by Michigan Island while hauling iron ore out of Ashland.	
Noquebay	United States	2 October 1905	The wooden schooner caught fire and sank in Lake Superior off the coast of Stockton Island, in Chequamegon Bay.	
Phoenix	United States	21 November 1847	Wooden steamship that caught fire from over-stoked boilers and burned to the waterline off the coast of Sheboygan, Wisconsin, killing at least 190 but perhaps more than 250 of the nearly 300 people on board. 40 people survived in lifeboats and three were rescued from the water.	
Pretoria	United States	2 September 1905	The wooden schooner sank in a storm on Lake Superior near the Apostle Islands	
Senator	United States	30 October 1929	A collision with Marquette in a dense fog sank Senator off Port Washington in Lake Michigan.	
Sevona	United States	2 September 1905	The steamboat sank in a storm on Lake Superior near Sand Island.	
Success	United States	26 November 1896	The scow schooner was pushed ashore by a gale during a storm off the coast of Sevastopol, Wisconsin.	
Tennie and Laura	United States	2 August 1903	The schooner was sailing from Muskegon, Michigan, to Milwaukee carrying a cargo of lumber worth roughly $500 at the time. The ship was crewed by two men of which one survived. About 9 nautical miles (17 km) from Port Washington she was caught in a storm. The ship eventually capsized.	

== Wyoming ==
Ship	Flag	Sunk date	Notes	Coordinates
E.C. Waters	United States	1906	A steamboat that was abandoned in Yellowstone Lake.	
