= SC-19 =

SC-19 may refer to:

- USS SC-19, an SC-1-class submarine chaser built for the United States Navy during World War I
- SC-19, a derivative of the DF-21 missile
