= O.J. Walker =

- O.J. Walker (shipwreck)
- U.S. National Register of Historic Places
- Location within Vermont Location within the United States
- Location: Burlington Bay, Burlington, Vermont
- Coordinates: 44°28′44″N 73°14′27″W
- Area: 2.9 acres (1.2 ha)
- Built: 1862
- Built by: Spear, Orson Saxton
- Architectural style: Sailing canal schooner
- NRHP reference No.: 98001270
- Added to NRHP: October 22, 1998

The O.J. Walker was a cargo schooner that plied the waters of Lake Champlain between New York and Vermont. Built in 1862 in Burlington, Vermont, she hauled freight until sinking off the Burlington coast in a storm in 1895, while carrying a load of brick and tile. The shipwreck, located west of the Burlington Breakwater, is a Vermont State Historic Site, and is accessible to registered divers. It is one of the best-preserved examples of the 1862 class of sailing canal schooners, and was listed on the National Register of Historic Places in 1998.

== Description and history ==
The O.J. Walker was a sailing schooner that was built to sail both on Lake Champlain and on the waters of the Champlain Canal after it was widened. She was 85.8 feet (26.2 m) long, with a beam of about 14.5 feet (4.4 m) and a hold depth of about 6.5 feet (2.0 m). She had a flat bottom with a short keel plank, only 6 inches (15 cm) in height. She was built using chine construction, a method common for the lake and canal vessels of the period. She had two masts and was rigged as a schooner.

She was built in 1862 by Orson Saxton Spear, one of the lake's leading shipbuilders of the period, at a shipyard in South Burlington. She was named for Obadiah Walker, a prominent Burlington businessman, apparently in the hopes that he would use her services. Her first owner was Joseph Kirby, who may have had some type of relationship (possibly financial) with Walker. By 1893, she was owned by John and Henry Brown, a father-son team who owned a brickyard on Malletts Bay in Colchester. On May 11, 1895, she was loaded with a cargo of brick and tile, destined for Shelburne, Vermont, when she was caught up in a storm and apparently sprang a leak. Based on evidence at the shipwreck site, her deck had been loaded with goods, and was probably topheavy. The deck goods were dumped when the ship rolled, but she then righted again before sinking. The captain and crew all survived.

The wreck of the O.J. Walker lies in the waters of Burlington Bay, outside the Burlington Breakwater. It is the only known sailing schooner wreck which includes elements of the masts and spars, giving crucial insight into the riggings of these vessels, which were built in large numbers in the mid-19th century. The wreck site is now one of Vermont's underwater historic sites, and is accessible to licensed divers; registration is required.

== See also ==
- National Register of Historic Places listings in Chittenden County, Vermont
- List of shipwrecks in the United States
