= SS Robert E. Lee =

Steam passenger ship built for the Eastern Steamship Lines

History

United States
- Name: Robert E. Lee
- Operator: Eastern Steamship Lines
- Builder: Newport News Shipbuilding
- Completed: 1924
- Fate: Torpedoed and sunk on 30 July 1942

General characteristics
- Type: Passenger ship
- Tonnage: 5,184
- Length: 373 ft (114 m)
- Beam: 54 ft (16 m)
- Depth: 29 ft (8.8 m)
- S.S. Robert E. Lee and U-166 (shipwrecks and remains)
- U.S. National Register of Historic Places
- Area: Adjacent to the U-166 submarine remains
- NRHP reference No.: 100002558
- Added to NRHP: 7 December 2018

SS Robert E. Lee was a steam passenger ship built for the Eastern Steamship Lines in 1924. It sank on 30 July 1942 after being torpedoed by the German submarine U-166 on its return to New Orleans.

== Design and construction ==
SS Robert E. Lee was built in Newport News, Virginia, and finished construction in 1924. The ship had a keel length of 375 feet (114 m), a beam length of 54 feet (16 m), and a depth of 29 feet (8.8 m). The ship was constructed to primarily transport passengers between Virginia and New York. She was named for Robert E. Lee, a general of the Confederate States of America who gained prominence during the American Civil War.

== Service history ==
=== Prewar ===
Following completion, Robert E. Lee was placed in passenger-cargo service between Norfolk, Virginia, and New York City. In the winter months, she was employed in service between New York and Boston, Massachusetts. She would continue working these routes until after the outbreak of World War II in 1939.

=== World War II ===
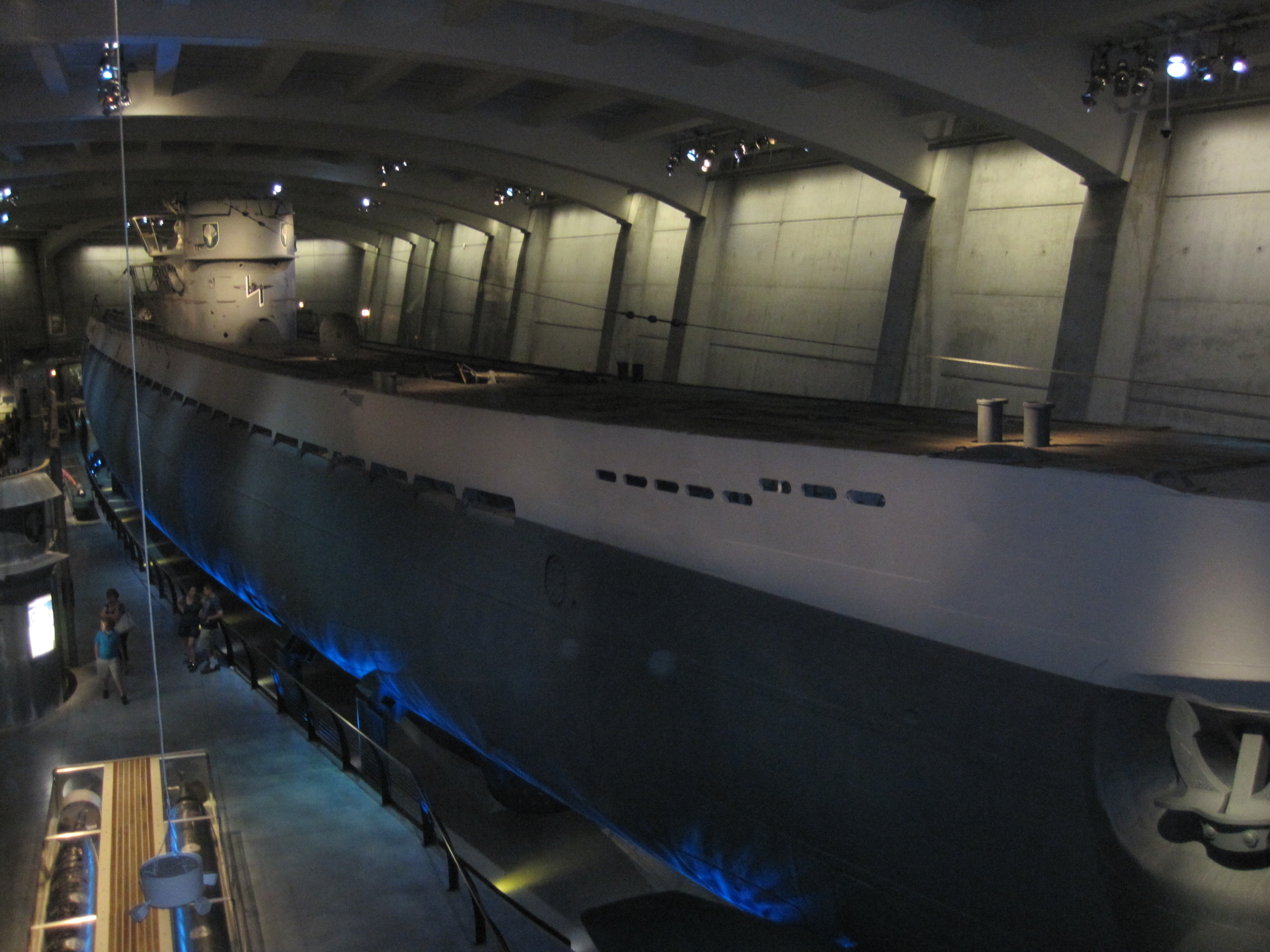
A Type IXC U-boat similar to U-166

In February 1942, Robert E. Lee was chartered by the Alcoa Steamship Company to transport goods and personnel from New York to ports located in the Caribbean. One month later, she was contracted by the War Shipping Administration as a freight carrier and was subsequently armed with a stern gun and degaussed to prevent magnetic mine attacks.

==== Sinking ====
On 30 July 1942, Robert E. Lee left Trinidad with around 270 passengers bound for Tampa, Florida. She initially traveled with convoy TAW-7, but was soon diverted to New Orleans along with the submarine chaser USS PC-566.

At 22:37, a single torpedo was fired at the ship by U-166. The torpedo was spotted by lookouts 200 yards (180 m) away, but no evasive action was able to be taken. The torpedo struck just aft of the engine room and destroyed the #3 hold. Further damage was also done to the radio compartment and the steering gear.

The ship began to list to port, and then starboard, before finally sinking by the stern about 15 minutes after the torpedo hit. Of the 407 crewmen and passengers, 15 passengers and 10 crewmen died in the sinking. The survivors were rescued by the patrol boats USS PC-566 and USS SC-19, and the tug Underwriter, and they were transported without incident to Venice, Louisiana.

== Wreckage ==
In 1986, an oil and gas survey conducted by Shell Offshore discovered the shipwreck of Robert E. Lee in the Mississippi Canyon. It was located at a depth of 4,700 feet (1,400 m). In January 2001, the wreckage was once again spotted, but this time it was located by C & C Technologies. Located one mile (1.6 km) away was the wreckage of German submarine U-166, which had been sunk with depth charges by PC-566.

== See also ==
- List of shipwrecks in July 1942
- National Register of Historic Places listings in Plaquemines Parish, Louisiana
