= General Butler (ship) =

- General Butler (shipwreck)
- U.S. National Register of Historic Places
- Location within Vermont
- Location: Burlington Bay, Burlington, Vermont
- Coordinates: 44°28′19″N 73°13′42″W
- Area: 2.9 acres (1.2 ha)
- Built: 1862
- Built by: Hoskins, Wesley J.; Hoskins, John
- Architectural style: Sailing canal schooner
- NRHP reference No.: 98001269
- Added to NRHP: October 22, 1998

The General Butler was a schooner-rigged sailing canal boat that plied the waters of Lake Champlain and the Champlain Canal in the United States states of Vermont and New York. Built in 1862 and named for American Civil War General Benjamin Franklin Butler, she sank after striking the Burlington Breakwater in 1876, while carrying a load of marble. Her virtually intact wreck, discovered in 1980, is a Vermont State Historic Site and a popular dive site; it was listed on the National Register of Historic Places in 1998.

== Description and history ==
The General Butler was a hybrid vessel, capable of navigating both the waters of Lake Champlain and the Champlain Canal. She was 88 feet (27 m) long, with a beam of 14 feet (4.3 m) and a hold depth of 6 feet (1.8 m). She was built using chine log construction from maple and oak. Since she was used in relatively calm waters, she had a shortened keel, and was fitted with a two-mast schooner sailing rig. She was built in 1862 by the Hoskins and Ross Shipyard of Essex, New York, and was one of the first ships built after the locks of the Champlain Canal were enlarged. In her 15-year career she had three owners. William Montgomery, the final owner, was a known risk-taker, and was carrying a load of marble from Isle La Motte to Burlington on December 9, 1876. During bad weather, her steering apparatus failed, and she struck the Burlington Breakwater while trying to round its southern end. The captain, deck hand, and the captain's daughters Cora and Ida, were all able to reach the safety of the breakwater before she went down. Her masts and rigging were salvaged soon afterward.

The shipwreck was discovered in 1980, lying in 35 feet (11 m) of water about 300 feet (91 m) west of the southern end of the Burlington Breakwater. The wreck is virtually intact except for the removal of her masts and rigging, and the effects of settling and silting on her structure, with Captain Montgomery's attempts to jury-rig the vessel's steering mechanism still in evidence. The wreck has since been the subject of numerous excavations. It is a Vermont state historic site, and may be visited by certified divers.

== See also ==
- National Register of Historic Places listings in Chittenden County, Vermont
- List of shipwrecks of the United States
