= German submarine U-171 =

German World War II submarine

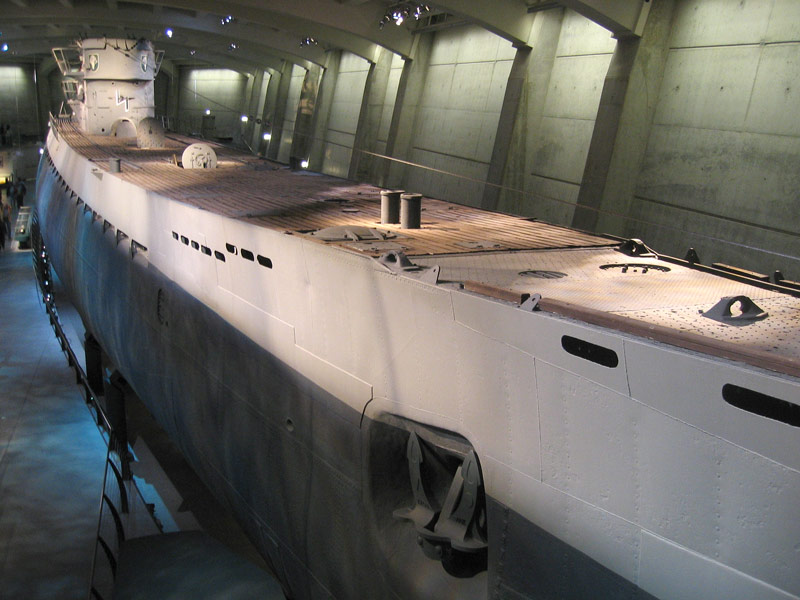
- U-505, a typical Type IXC boat

History

Nazi Germany
- Name: U-171
- Ordered: 23 December 1939
- Builder: DeSchiMAG AG Weser, Bremen
- Yard number: 1011
- Laid down: 1 December 1940
- Launched: 22 July 1941
- Commissioned: 25 October 1941
- Fate: Sunk by a mine 9 October 1942 in the Bay of Biscay. 22 crew killed, 30 survivors.

General characteristics
- Class & type: Type IXC submarine
- Displacement: 1,120 t (1,100 long tons) surfaced; 1,232 t (1,213 long tons) submerged
- Length: 76.76 m (251 ft 10 in) o/a; 58.75 m (192 ft 9 in) pressure hull
- Beam: 6.76 m (22 ft 2 in) o/a; 4.40 m (14 ft 5 in) pressure hull
- Height: 9.60 m (31 ft 6 in)
- Draught: 4.70 m (15 ft 5 in)
- Installed power: 4,400 PS (3,200 kW; 4,300 bhp) (diesels); 1,000 PS (740 kW; 990 shp) (electric)
- Propulsion: 2 shafts; 2 × diesel engines; 2 × electric motors
- Speed: 18.3 knots (33.9 km/h; 21.1 mph) surfaced; 7.7 knots (14.3 km/h; 8.9 mph) submerged
- Range: 13,450 nmi (24,910 km; 15,480 mi) at 10 knots (19 km/h; 12 mph) surfaced; 64 nmi (119 km; 74 mi) at 4 knots (7.4 km/h; 4.6 mph) submerged
- Complement: 4 officers, 44 enlisted
- Armament: 6 × torpedo tubes (4 bow, 2 stern); 22 × 53.3 cm (21 in) torpedoes; 1 × 10.5 cm (4.1 in) SK C/32 deck gun (180 rounds); 1 × 3.7 cm (1.5 in) SK C/30 AA gun; 1 × twin 2 cm FlaK 30 AA guns

Service record
- Part of: 4th U-boat Flotilla; 25 October 1941 – 30 June 1942; 10th U-boat Flotilla; 1 July – 9 October 1942
- Identification codes: M 29 121
- Commanders: Kptlt. Günther Pfeffer; 25 October 1941 – 9 October 1942
- Operations: 1 patrol: 17 June – 9 October 1942
- Victories: 3 merchant ships sunk (17,641 GRT)

German submarine U-171 was a Type IXC U-boat of Germany's Kriegsmarine built for service during World War II. It was laid down on 1 December 1940 at the DeSchiMAG AG Weser yard at Bremen as yard number 1011, launched on 22 July 1941, and commissioned on 25 October 1941 under the command of Kapitänleutnant Günther Pfeffer.

After training with the 4th U-boat Flotilla, U-171 was transferred to the 10th U-boat Flotilla for front-line service on 1 July 1942. It was sent to patrol in the Gulf of Mexico. It was sunk by a naval mine in the Bay of Biscay 115 days into its first and only patrol, whilst returning to Lorient in occupied France, with the loss of 22 of its crew of 54. For many years it was believed U-166 was sunk by an American aircraft in what was, in reality, an unsuccessful attack on U-171 in the Gulf of Mexico.

== Design ==
German Type IXC submarines were slightly larger than the original Type IXBs. U-171 had a displacement of 1,120 tonnes (1,100 long tons) when at the surface and 1,232 tonnes (1,213 long tons) while submerged. The U-boat had a total length of 76.76 m (251 ft 10 in), a pressure hull length of 58.75 m (192 ft 9 in), a beam of 6.76 m (22 ft 2 in), a height of 9.60 m (31 ft 6 in), and a draught of 4.70 m (15 ft 5 in). The submarine was powered by two MAN M 9 V 40/46 supercharged four-stroke, nine-cylinder diesel engines producing a total of 4,400 metric horsepower (3,240 kW; 4,340 shp) for use while surfaced, two Siemens-Schuckert 2 GU 345/34 double-acting electric motors producing a total of 1,000 metric horsepower (740 kW; 990 shp) for use while submerged. She had two shafts and two 1.92 m (6 ft) propellers. The boat was capable of operating at depths of up to 230 metres (750 ft).

The submarine had a maximum surface speed of 18.3 knots (33.9 km/h; 21.1 mph) and a maximum submerged speed of 7.3 knots (13.5 km/h; 8.4 mph). When submerged, the boat could operate for 63 nautical miles (117 km; 72 mi) at 4 knots (7.4 km/h; 4.6 mph); when surfaced, she could travel 13,450 nautical miles (24,910 km; 15,480 mi) at 10 knots (19 km/h; 12 mph). U-171 was fitted with six 53.3 cm (21 in) torpedo tubes (four fitted at the bow and two at the stern), 22 torpedoes, one 10.5 cm (4.13 in) SK C/32 naval gun, 180 rounds, and a 3.7 cm (1.5 in) SK C/30 as well as a 2 cm (0.79 in) C/30 anti-aircraft gun. The boat had a complement of forty-eight.

== Service history ==
=== Patrol ===
U-171 departed Kiel on 17 June 1942, at the end of which it was to return to Lorient, where it would be based for future sorties. It negotiated the 'gap' between Iceland and the Faroe Islands and crossed the Atlantic Ocean, entering the Gulf of Mexico.

The submarine sank the 4,351 GRT Mexican general cargo merchant ship, SS Oaxaca on 26 July 1942, at 28°23′N 96°08′W off Corpus Christi, Texas. The ship was at the time en route from New Orleans to Tampico via Veracruz. The first spread of two torpedoes missed the ship, but a second spread, also of two eels (German U-boat slang for torpedoes), was successful when one hit the port side near the fore-part of the ship. Six of the crew of 45 died.

On 1 August 1942, also in the Gulf of Mexico, U-171 came under attack from a U.S. Coast Guard J4F-1 Widgeon aircraft, causing it little damage. However, for decades it was believed that the U-boat attacked that day was U-166; the credit for sinking U-166 went to that aircraft.

The wreckage of U-166 was discovered in 2001, just a short distance from its last victim, Robert E. Lee, meaning that the credit for the sinking of U-166 should have gone to the U.S. Navy patrol craft, PC-566, which had reported that they believed they were successful in their depth charge attack on the submarine following the U-boat's successful torpedoing of Robert E. Lee, but PC-566 were believed by investigating officials to have missed.

Having not been sunk, as had been believed by the Allies, U-171 continued its patrol. On 13 August 1942 it sank the 6,779 GRT US tanker R. M. Parker Jr. at 28°50′N 90°42′W which is about 25 nmi (46 km; 29 mi) south of Isles Dernieres, Louisiana. The ship, which was carrying water ballast, was struck by two torpedoes; the submarine then surfaced and fired five rounds from its deck gun into the wreck. The whole crew of 44 survived, being picked up eight hours later by the United States Coast Guard auxiliary USS Pioneer (AM-105).

On 4 September 1942, the submarine had its final success, the Mexican tanker Amatlan 6,511 GRT; again in ballast, at 23°27′N 97°30′W. This ship had evaded three spreads of two torpedoes each, before being hit by a torpedo fired from U-171's stern tube. There were 10 dead and 24 survivors.

==== Loss ====
U-171 was sunk at 13:00 hours on 9 October 1942 in the Bay of Biscay near Lorient, in position 47°39′N 03°34′W, by a mine. Twenty-two men died, thirty survived. Captain Günther Pfeffer (1914–1966), was one of the lucky ones.

The wrecked submarine was classified as a "military cemetery" in 1999 by the French authorities: divers are then warned that going inside the boat is strictly forbidden.

== Summary of raiding history ==
Date	Name	Nationality	Tonnage (GRT)	Fate
26 July 1942	Oaxaca	Mexico	4,351	Sunk
13 August 1942	Arlyn	United States	6,779	Sunk
4 September 1942	Amatlan	Mexico	6,511	Sunk

== Bibliography ==
- Busch, Rainer; Röll, Hans-Joachim (1999). German U-boat commanders of World War II : a biographical dictionary. Translated by Brooks, Geoffrey. London, Annapolis, Md: Greenhill Books, Naval Institute Press. ISBN 1-55750-186-6.
- Busch, Rainer; Röll, Hans-Joachim (1999). Deutsche U-Boot-Verluste von September 1939 bis Mai 1945 [German U-boat losses from September 1939 to May 1945]. Der U-Boot-Krieg (in German). Vol. IV. Hamburg, Berlin, Bonn: Mittler. ISBN 3-8132-0514-2.
- Gröner, Erich; Jung, Dieter; Maass, Martin (1991). U-boats and Mine Warfare Vessels. German Warships 1815–1945. Vol. 2. Translated by Thomas, Keith; Magowan, Rachel. London: Conway Maritime Press. ISBN 0-85177-593-4.
- Kemp, Paul (1999). U-Boats Destroyed - German Submarine Losses in the World Wars. London: Arms & Armour. ISBN 1-85409-515-3.
