= Burlington Bay Horse Ferry =

- U.S. National Register of Historic Places
- Location within Vermont Location within the United States
- Location: in the waters of Lake Champlain, off Burlington, Vermont
- Coordinates: 44°29′7″N 73°14′35″W
- Area: less than one acre
- Built: 1830
- Architectural style: Horse-powered ferry
- NRHP reference No.: 93001384
- Added to NRHP: December 15, 1993

The Burlington Bay Horse Ferry is a shipwreck in Lake Champlain off Burlington, Vermont, United States. It is the only known example of a turntable horse ferry, a ship type that was common on United States waterways in the mid-19th century. The wreck is a Vermont State Historic Site, and was listed on the National Register of Historic Places in 1993. Its location is marked by buoys in Burlington Bay between the northern end of the Burlington Breakwater and Lone Rock Point, and it is visitable by certified divers.

== Archaeological history ==
The remains of the horse ferry were discovered in 1983 during a side-scan sonar survey of Burlington Bay. Through the 1980s it was subjected to several investigations, including a National Geographic expedition that was published in 1988. Between 1989 and 1992 divers visited the site, in which test areas were excavated in order to document the structure of the vessel and its propulsion mechanism. The forward third of the ferry is missing, although there is evidence it was still attached at the time the ferry sank or was scuttled.

Based on analysis of the wreck, the ferry was 62 feet 5 inches (19.02 m) long, and had a beam of 15 feet 3 inches (4.65 m). It had a maximum height of 4 feet 8 inches (1.42 m), with a hold depth of 3 feet 11 inches (1.19 m). The hull was double-ended, with a curved stempost and straight sternpost. Its propulsion mechanism followed a design patented in 1819 by Barnabas Langdon of Whitehall, New York. A central turntable, mounted at a level below the main deck, was connected by a gearing system to a sidewheel. Horses walked on the turntable, whose resulting rotation moved the sidewheel, providing forward motion through the water.

== See also ==
- National Register of Historic Places listings in Chittenden County, Vermont
