= List of Vermont State Historic Sites =

This is a list of official Vermont State Historic Sites in the U.S. state of Vermont.

- Bennington Battle Monument State Historic Site – Obelisk commemorating the Battle of Bennington
- Chester A. Arthur State Historic Site – President Chester A. Arthur birthplace
- Chimney Point State Historic Site – Exhibits interpreting over 7,500 years of human habitation by three cultures; Native American, French colonial, and Early American
- President Calvin Coolidge State Historic Site – President Calvin Coolidge birthplace and homestead
- Eureka Schoolhouse State Historic Site – c. 1790 early Vermont one room school house
- Hubbardton Battlefield – site of the Revolutionary War Battle of Hubbardton
- Senator Justin Morrill State Historic Site – Justin Smith Morrill homestead
- Mount Independence – site of Revolutionary War fortifications
- Old Constitution House State Historic Site – Site of Vermont Constitution's convention
- Seven shipwrecks in the waters of Lake Champlain:
  - Burlington Bay Horse Ferry
  - General Butler
  - O.J. Walker
  - Phoenix
  - Champlain II
  - Coal Barge
  - Diamond Island Stone Boat
