= Chester Alan Arthur State Historic Site =

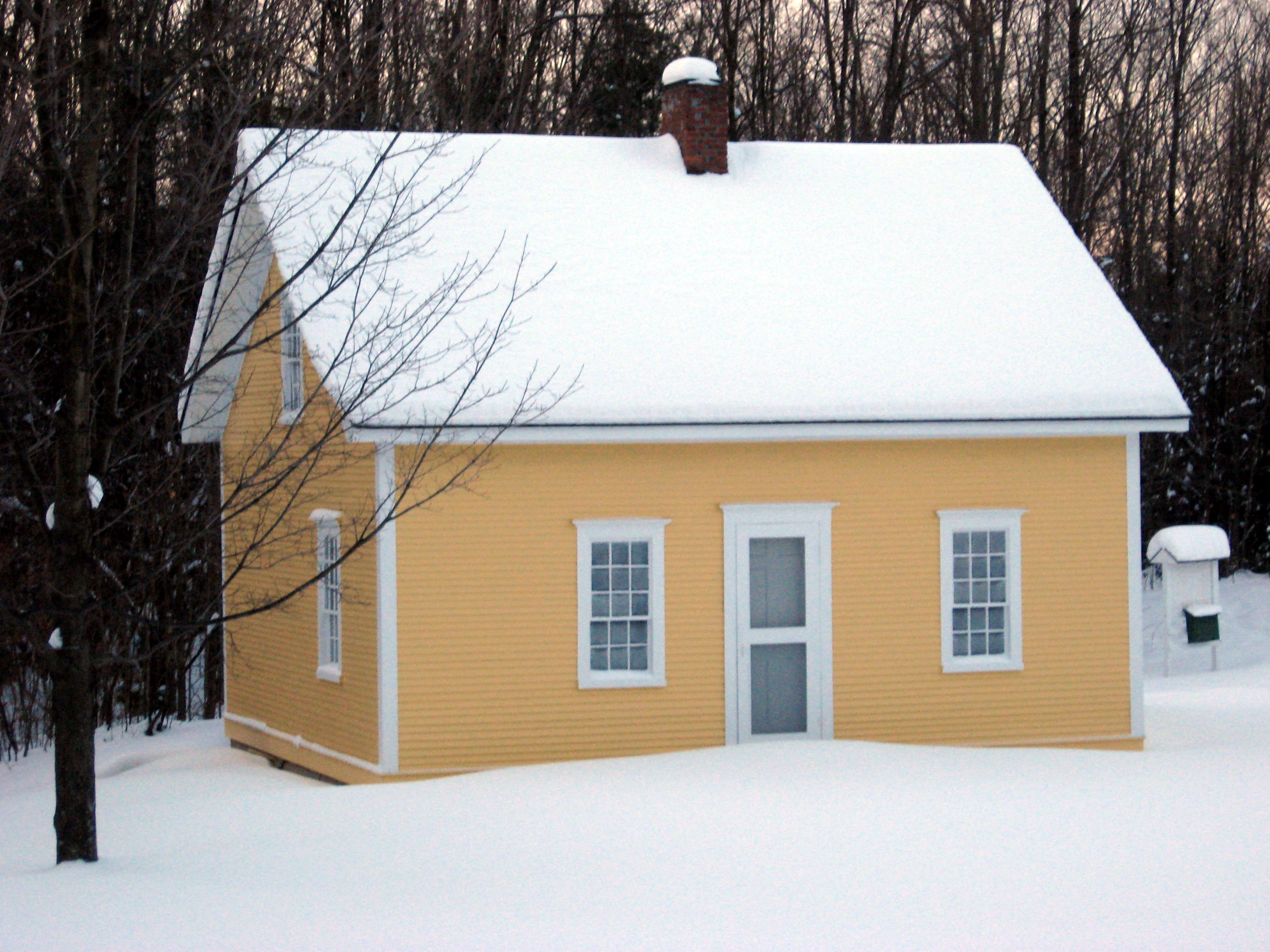
- Replica of the birth home of President Chester A. Arthur
- Established: 1903
- Location: 4588 Chester Arthur Rd. Fairfield, Vermont
- Coordinates: 44.814446°N 72.932401°W
- Type: Biographical museum
- Website: historicsites.vermont.gov/chester-arthur

The President Chester A. Arthur State Historic Site is a state historic site located in Fairfield, Vermont. It honors Chester A. Arthur, the 21st president of the United States, who was born in Vermont in 1829. The site includes a replica of the original early 19th-century home in which he was born that was constructed in 1953 using an old photograph of the house as a guide. In 1903, a granite monument was dedicated on the spot where it was thought he had been born.

Visitors can also tour the nearby Fairfield Baptist Church, the church where his father served as preacher.

== Present day ==
Today, the home is available for tours on weekends from July through mid-October. It is owned by the State of Vermont and open as a Vermont State Historic Site.

== See also ==
- Chester A. Arthur Home in New York City
- List of residences of presidents of the United States
