= Phoenix (1815 steamer) =

- Phoenix (Shipwreck)
- U.S. National Register of Historic Places
- Location within Vermont Location within the United States
- Location: Colchester Shoal, Colchester Reef, Colchester, Vermont
- Coordinates: 44°33′11″N 73°19′52″W
- Area: 2.9 acres (1.2 ha)
- Built: 1815
- Built by: Sherman, Jahaziel
- Architectural style: Sidewheel steamboat
- NRHP reference No.: 98001268
- Added to NRHP: November 5, 1998

The Phoenix was a sidewheel paddle steamer operating on Lake Champlain between the United States states of New York and Vermont, and the British province of Lower Canada (present-day Quebec). Built in 1815, she grounded, burned and sank in 1819 off the shore of Colchester, Vermont. Her surviving wreckage (approximately 40% complete) is the oldest known example of a sidewheel steamer anywhere in the world. The wreck site is a Vermont State Historic Site, which may be visited by registered and qualified divers. It was listed on the National Register of Historic Places in 1998.

== Description and history ==
The Phoenix was a wooden frame steamship, with a total length of 146 feet (45 m), a beam of 27 feet (8.2 m), and a hull depth of 9.25 feet (2.82 m). Her keel measured 125 feet (38 m), to which a 120-foot (37 m) keelson was bolted for added stability. There were 66 full frames along the hull length. The area amidships featured additional stringers and timbering to support the heavy steam engine that was located there. She was reported to have a gracefully curved hull that flared out in a manner similar to whaleboats. She was powered by a steeple engine, which was supplemented by windpower provided from sails attached to a single mast.

The Phoenix was built in 1815 by the Lake Champlain Steam-boat Company at its shipyard in Vergennes, Vermont, under the direction of Jahaziel Sherman. She was the second steamer to sail on Lake Champlain, after the Vermont (launched in 1808), which was the first regularly operated steamship anywhere. The Phoenix was fitted with a steam engine that had previously been used on another steamship that had sailed on the Hudson River. She was operated for four years on a route between Whitehall, New York and Saint-Jean-sur-Richelieu in what is now the Canadian province of Quebec. In 1817, she carried President James Monroe from Burlington, Vermont to Plattsburgh, New York, and in 1818 she carried the remains of American Revolutionary War general Richard Montgomery, en route from Quebec City (where he died in the 1775 Battle of Quebec) to his final resting place in New York City.

On September 4, 1819, she caught fire after departing from Burlington. Most of the passengers and crew safely made their escape, but six perished due to the flames or drowning. The ship grounded on Colchester Reef and was burned to the waterline. The company salvaged equipment from the wreck, including the steam engine, and the remnant hulk was dragged off the reef the following spring and allowed to sink. There was a great deal of speculation at the time that the fire was deliberately set by individuals unhappy with the advent of steam powered ships.

The shipwreck was discovered on September 4, 1978, exactly 159 years after her demise. She lies on the sloping bottom of the lake, between 60 and 110 feet depth. The wreck is about 40% complete, the consequence of post-fire salvage, subsequent salvage work, and the ravages of time. The two charred paddlewheel structures were discovered north of the steamers hull by diver Gary Lefebvre on August 28, 2020, in about 180 and 190 feet of water.

== See also ==
- National Register of Historic Places listings in Chittenden County, Vermont
- List of shipwrecks in the United States
