= Biryulka =

Biryulka Бирюлька
- Selo
- Interactive map of Biryulka
- Location of Biryulka Biryulka (Irkutsk Oblast)
- Coordinates: 53°50′21″N 106°23′39″E
- Country: Russia
- Federal subject: Irkutsk Oblast
- Administrative district: Kachugsky District
- Founded: 1668
- Elevation: 548 m (1,798 ft)

Population
  - Estimate (2012): 592 )

Municipal status
  - Municipal district: Kachugsky Municipal District
  - Rural settlement: Biryulskoye Rural Settlement
  - Capital of: Biryulskoye Rural Settlement
- Time zone: UTC+8 (MSK+5)
- Postal code: 666220
- Dialing code: +7 39540
- OKTMO ID: 25618407101

Ice bridge in the selo of Biryulka Ледовая переправа через Лену в селе Бирюлька
- Coordinates: 53°52′07″N 106°19′37″E
- Carries: Automotive, foot
- Crosses: Lena River
- Locale: Biryulka, Kachugsky District, Irkutsk Oblast, Russia

Characteristics
- Design: Ice platform
- Material: Ice
- Piers in water: 0
- Load limit: 20 tonnes
- Clearance above: 0

History
- Opened: Every winter
- Closed: Every spring

Location
- Interactive map of Ice bridge in the selo of Biryulka

Biryulka (Russian: Бирю́лька) is a rural locality (a selo) in Kachugsky District of Irkutsk Oblast, Russia, located on the Lena River near its headwaters northwest of Lake Baikal.

== Etymology ==
Biryulka is named after the small Bira River, the name of which in turn comes from an Evenk word.

== History ==
In 1688, sixteen peasant families settled here. The founders were Stepan Alexandrovich and Mikhail Kostyakov. The Yakutsk stavlenik Onichkov allocated them an average of 1 arpent (0.34 ha) per family. It seems that seven of these families were exiles and nine were of freed serfs. The population increased quickly through natural increase and immigration. Other villages developed in the area around Biryulka. Biryulskaya Volost, subordinate to Yakutsk, was eventually established. In 1696, the inhabitants of Biryulka staged a revolt led by Pavel Khaletsky.

At the beginning of the 20th century, well-known archeologist Alexey Okladnikov went to school here, but later moved to the selo of Anga where he finished secondary school in 1925. One of the streets in Biryulka is named after him.

One of the battles of the Great Siberian Ice March, a retreat of the White Army east across Lake Baikal, took place near Biryulka in 1920.

A number of inhabitants were arrested during the Great Purge.

== Politics ==
Municipally, Biryulka is the administrative center of the Biryulskoye Rural Settlement in Kachugsky Municipal District, the head of which is Tatyana Sergeyeva, of the United Russia party who was elected in October 2009.

== Economy and infrastructure ==
Biryulka is well known for the manufacture of shallow-draft river boats called shitiks, which have been used on the upper Lena for centuries.

Near Biryulka is the archaeological site of Mokrushinsky burial ground. Work has been conducted since the 1980s, in part by students and archeologists.

In 2006, a volunteer fire department was organized with its own fire-engine and a water tower.

In winter, there is a winter road with an ice-bridge across the Lena River. This is the uppermost crossing of the Lena.
