= USS Verdi =

United States Navy patrol vessel

Coordinates: 44.2495°N 76.1547°W

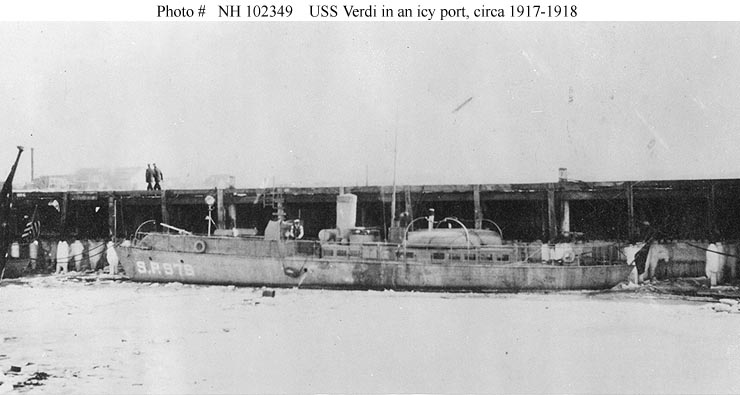
- USS Verdi (SP-979) in an icy port during World War I.

History

United States
- Name: USS Verdi
- Namesake: Previous name retained
- Builder: Charles L. Seabury Company and Gas Engine and Power Company, Morris Heights, the Bronx, New York
- Completed: 1909
- Acquired: 30 June 1917
- Commissioned: 10 August 1917
- Fate: Returned to owner 4 December 1918; wrecked 31 July 1935
- Notes: Operated as private motorboat Verdi 1909-1917 and 1918-1935

General characteristics
- Type: Patrol vessel
- Displacement: 28 tons
- Length: 75 ft 0 in (22.86 m)
- Beam: 11 ft 5 in (3.48 m)
- Draft: 3 ft 6 in (1.07 m)
- Speed: 15 knots
- Armament: 1 × 1-pounder gun; 1 × machine gun

USS Verdi (SP-979) was a United States Navy patrol vessel in commission from 1917 to 1918.

Verdi was built as a private motorboat of the same name in 1909 by the Charles L. Seabury Company and the Gas Engine and Power Company at Morris Heights in the Bronx, New York. She was the property of Walter J. Green of Utica, New York, and home-ported at Clayton, New York, on the St. Lawrence River when the U.S. Navy acquired her from Green on 30 June 1917 for use as a section patrol boat during World War I. She was commissioned as USS Verdi (SP-979) on 10 August 1917.

Assigned to the 9th Naval District, Verdi patrolled on the Great Lakes for the rest of World War I.

Verdi was returned to Green on 4 December 1918. She remained in civilian use until 31 July 1935, when she became stranded in the St. Lawrence River about 500 feet (150 meters) off Watch Island, New York, and became a total loss.
