= Oaxaca (ship) =

Coordinates: 28°22′N 96°11′W

History

Germany
- Name: Roland
- Builder: Stettiner Maschinenbau AG "Vulcan", Stettin
- Launched: 1921
- Acquired: 1936 renamed Hameln for Norddeutscher Lloyd, Bremen
- Fate: Seized by Mexico 1941

Mexico
- Name: Oaxaca
- Owner: Cia Mexicana de Navegacion, Vera Cruz, Mexico
- Acquired: 1941
- Fate: Sunk 26 July 1942

General characteristics
- Tonnage: 4,351 tons

Oaxaca (previously the German Hameln) was a Mexican freighter that was sunk on July 26, 1942 by the German Type IX submarine U-171, commanded by Oberleutnant Günther Pfeffer, a few hours after she left the port of Corpus Christi, Texas. The ship was hit by one torpedo and broke in two, sinking within three or four minutes. Six crewmen were lost.

The wreck lies approximately 11 nautical miles (20 km) off of Port O'Connor, Texas, resting in 60 to 64 feet (18 to 20 meters) of water. Sidescan sonar and sub-bottom profiler investigations suggest the ship is sitting upright in two pieces on the seafloor.
