= Elizabeth M =

American towboat

Coordinates: 40.64955°N 80.38636°W

Elizabeth M was a towboat that sank in the Ohio River on January 9, 2005. The sinking of the vessel resulted in the death of four of the seven crew when the Elizabeth M accidentally went over the Montgomery Locks and Dam near the Pittsburgh suburb of Industry, Pennsylvania. It was originally named the B.F. Fairless, in honor of Benjamin Franklin Fairless, when it was launched by the Dravo Corporation in 1951.

== Tragedy ==
The Braddock bound Elizabeth M was pushing four barges through the lock when the strong current of the river pushed the tug and its load over the dam. High water was partly blamed for the incident. Two of the six crew managed to escape the sinking ship, but four perished, and the last was found weeks later inside the sunken vessel when the ship was raised from the bottom of the river. The sinking of the Elizabeth M is one of the most recent maritime disasters on the Ohio.
