= SS Governor (1907) =

Coastal steamship of the Pacific Coast Steamship Co.

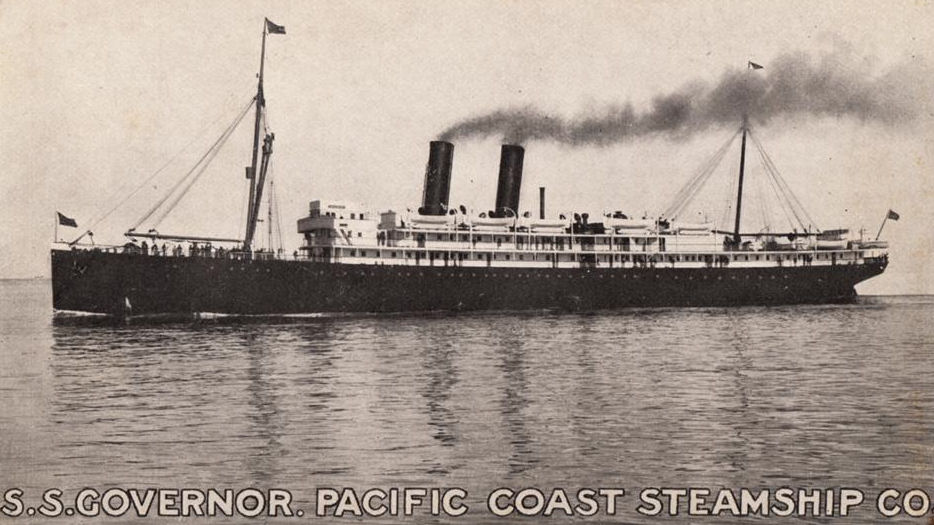

History

United States
- Name: Governor
- Owner: Pacific Coast Steamship Co.
- Ordered: 1906
- Builder: New York Shipbuilding Co., Camden, New Jersey
- Launched: 1907
- Completed: 1907
- Out of service: 1 April 1921
- Fate: Sunk after collision
- Notes: Sister ship to the SS Congress

General characteristics
- Length: 417 ft (127 m)
- Beam: 48 ft (15 m)
- Draught: 22 ft (6.7 m)
- Depth: 37 ft (11 m)
- Speed: 15.5 knots (28.7 km/h; 17.8 mph)
- Capacity: 566 passengers

SS Governor was a coastal steamship built in 1907 by New York Shipbuilding Corporation. Governor could make 15.5 knots (28.7 km/h; 17.8 mph) and carry 566 passengers. She was built for Pacific Ocean coastal service along with SS Congress and SS President, serving cities such as San Francisco, Los Angeles, Vancouver and Victoria.

== Loss ==
On 1 April 1921, while bound from San Francisco to Seattle, she was struck by the USSB West Hartland amidships on her starboard side during foggy weather at Puget Sound. Power aboard was lost immediately. Impressively, thanks to West Hartland's captain ordering full speed ahead, the West Hartland kept her position, keeping the hole plugged and allowing the Governor's crew and passengers to jump aboard her. She sunk in under 20 minutes with the loss of only eight people.

== Salvage attempts ==
Since her sinking in 1921, there have been a handful of attempts at salvaging the ship's cargo. The first dive to Governor happened in 1976 by Kelly Finn and Eric Morris. They returned yet again in 1981. A vault aboard Governor was rumoured to contain $1.5 million worth of gold coins. To this day, the safe has not been recovered.
