= Shitik =

Type of vessel

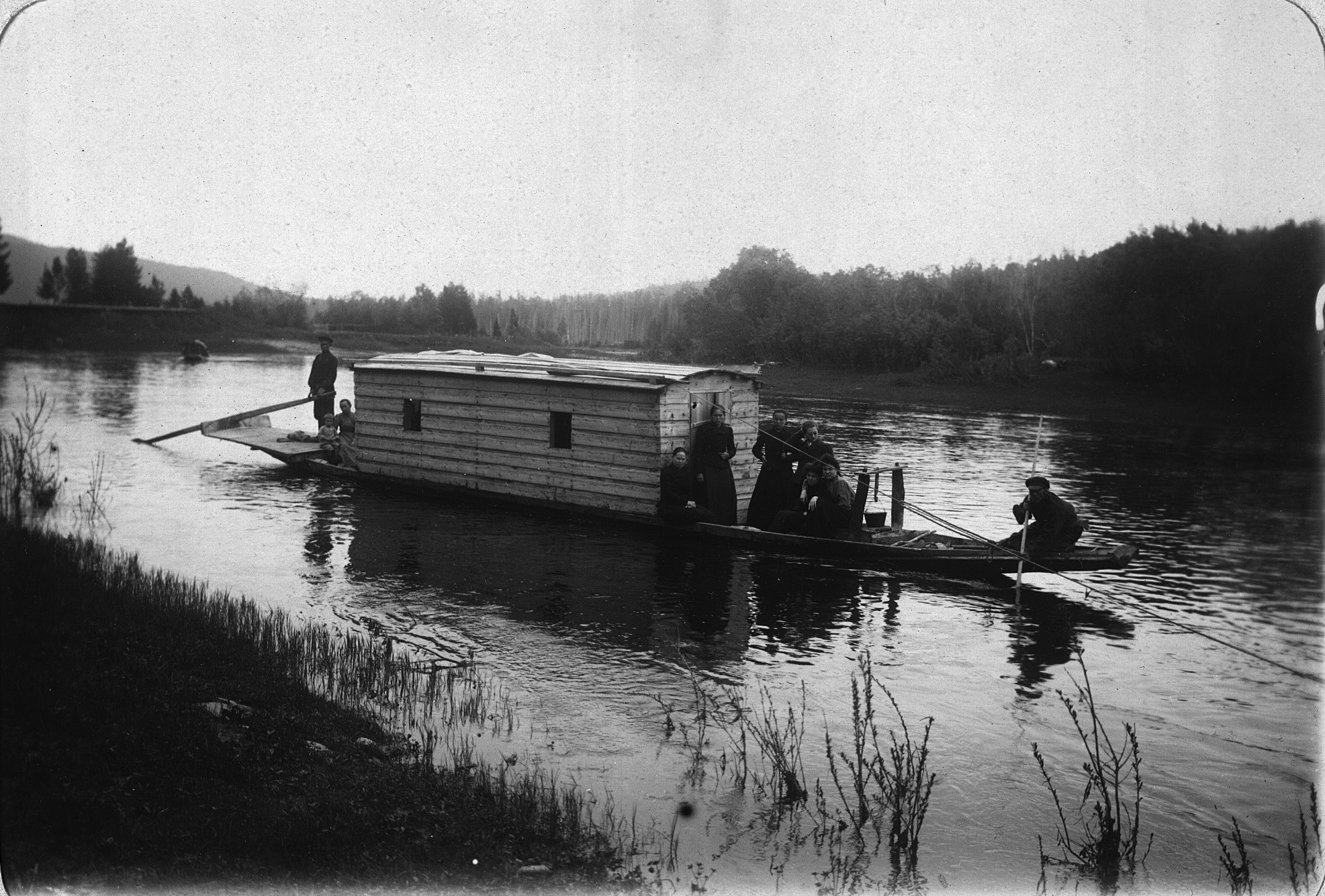
- A Shitik on the Lena River in the 1890s

Class overview
- Name: Shitik Russian: Шитик
- Builders: Biryulka

General characteristics
- Class & type: Riverboat
- Notes: a river flat-bottomed sail and rowing vessel
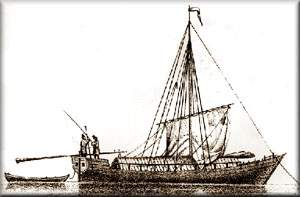
- Shitik in Russian NorthEngraving of a Shitik in the north of Russia

Shitik (Russian: Шитик) is a small, broad-bottomed vessel in which parts of the hull have been sewed with belts or juniper and fir-tree rods called vinya (Russian: Виня).

== Etymology ==
There are two proposed origins for the name of this boat. The first is that it comes from the verb Russian: Сшивать, meaning 'to sew'. This explains some of the design features of the boat. The second is that the shape of the boat is similar to that of larvae of Trichoptera, which are also called Russian: Шитик (shitik).

== Types ==
The term Shitik refers to two different vessel types:

=== Sea Cargo Ship ===
The Shitik was a keeled vessel, powered by sail and oars. It was used as a sea trade and transport ship. The ship has a rounded-off bottom and, therefore, features a considerable expansion of the hull and disorder of boards. This design improves the ship's performance.

General Characteristics
| Length | 12 metres (39 ft) – 15 metres (49 ft) |
| Width | 3 metres (9.8 ft) – 4 metres (13 ft) |
| Draft | 0.18 metres (0.59 ft) |
| Hull height at midships | 0.8 metres (2.6 ft) |
| load-carrying capacity | 15 – 24 tons |

Shitik had a single mast with a direct sail, oars, and a hinged wheel. The vessel had a canopy to protect the cargo from the rain although there is also a bunkhouse below the deck.

The underwater contours of the vessel allowed it to navigate in ice: when compressed it was squeezed out onto the surface. When docking the ship and hauling the anchor, Shitik needs the assistance of a vessel called osinovka boat.

It is believed that in the 13th century, the Shitik was the most widespread coastal transport vessel. Shitiks were mainly built between the 11th–17th centuries. Initially, Shitiks were built on the coast of the White Sea, and the Northern Dvina, Sukhona, Vychegda, Vetluga, and Tikhvinka rivers. Later the building of such boats also spread in Siberia and the Far East, since Shitiks plied the Pacific Ocean.

Shitiks were regularly used during the first phase of the Russian maritime fur trade in the North Pacific, from the 1740s to 1799, especially for exploring and collecting furs in the Aleutian Islands. They continued to be used in Russian America by the Russian-American Company in the early 19th century.

=== River boat ===
Shitiks were an important innovation on the Siberian rivers. Many shallows and reefs made a keel useless, and a shortage of nails made it necessary to improve techniques of sewing the planks. It was successfully operated throughout the 18th–20th centuries, being gradually replaced with new types of ship.

When artisan shipbuilders had the opportunity to use aluminium, the boat found a new niche. It is basically used by hunters and fishermen to reach inaccessible places in the taiga. Making Shitiks is popular on the Lena River in Siberia, Russia.

The design of the boat has been retained, but they are now made of aluminium sheet. Shitiks now have pointed bows instead of sawn-off ends. Sails are no longer used; they are powered by outboard motors.

Shitiks are useful in overcoming shoals; they have speed and adequate capacity. The absence of a keel is a problem, as it results to poor stability. Such a boat does not transfer a wave, and every movement of a passenger risks capsizing the vessel. But this combination of features suits hunters and fishermen, who can use it to cross rivers of 30 centimetres (0.98 ft) – 40 centimetres (1.3 ft) depth.

Well known Shitiks: on the First Kamchatka expedition under the command of Vitus Bering, an auxiliary vessel "Fortuna" boat-shitik was used (in other sources it was a two-masted Galiot)

== See also ==
- Barge
- Flatboat
- Keelboat
- Riverboat
