= Burlington Breakwater =

- U.S. National Register of Historic Places
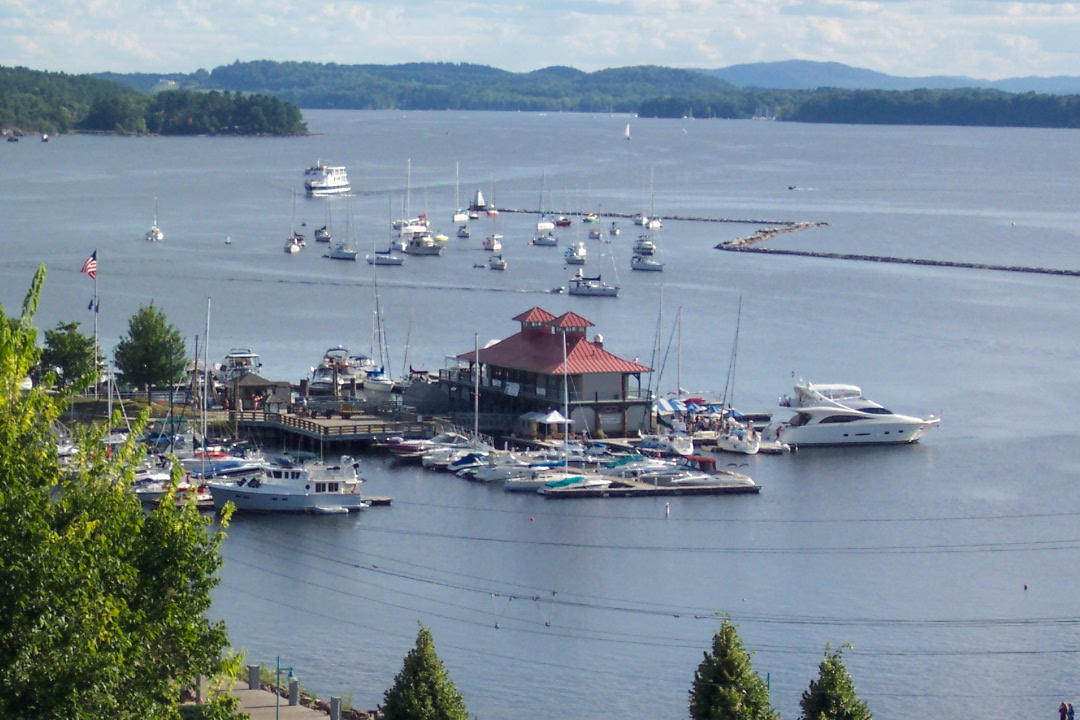

- Location within Vermont Location within the United States
- Location: Lake Champlain, off downtown Burlington, Vermont
- Coordinates: 44°28′32″N 73°13′33″W
- Area: 9.8 acres (4.0 ha)
- Built: 1836
- Built by: Dept of War; Whitney, Luther
- Architectural style: Breakwater
- NRHP reference No.: 02000711
- Added to NRHP: June 6, 2003

The Burlington Breakwater is a breakwater providing shelter to the harbor of Burlington, Vermont from the open waters of Lake Champlain. It was built in several stages between 1836 and 1890, and is a rare example of a 19th-century timber-cribbed stone breakwater. It was listed on the National Register of Historic Places in 2003.

== Description and history ==
The harbor of Burlington, Vermont is located near the center of Burlington Bay, which extends from Appletree Point in the north to Shelburne Point in the south. Set off from the city's port area, the Burlington Breakwater shelters that area from the broad waters of Lake Champlain to west. The breakwater consists of a main section 3,793 feet (1,156 m) in length, with a 364-foot (111 m) section to the north, separated by a channel 200 feet (61 m) wide. The structure has seven legs laid out in a zig-zag pattern, laid out to roughly follow the contour of the shoreline. Its visible portions are covered by a variety of stone materials. Its underwater structure consists of timber cribs, most laid on a rubble foundation, that are filled with rubblestone. The cribs are hemlock at the lower levels and white pine at the upper levels, and are joined by notched corners. Most of the upper levels of the cribbing have been replaced by stone because of subsequent rotting. The lake-facing side of the breakwater was largely faced in riprap in 1961. The ends of the breakwater are marked by modern lights.

The oldest portion of the breakwater, about 1,000 feet (300 m) long, was built between 1836 and 1854, and consists of the middle sections of the present structure. It was built as part of a program by the federal War Department to improve shelter for the major port facilities on Lake Champlain.

Near the breakwater's southern end lies the shipwrecked General Butler, which struck the breakwater during a storm in 1876 and sank, its passengers and crew reaching safety on the breakwater before she sank. It is now a popular dive site.

== See also ==
- National Register of Historic Places listings in Chittenden County, Vermont
