= German submarine U-166 (1941) =

German World War II submarine

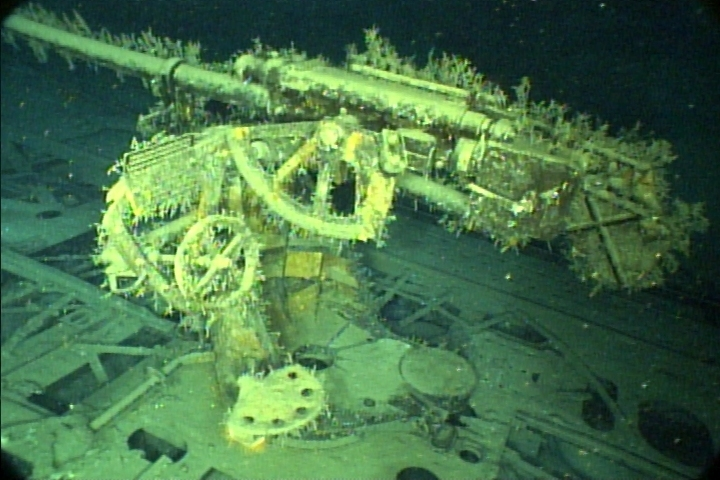
- 3.7cm anti-aircraft gun of the sunken U-166

History

Nazi Germany
- Name: U-166
- Ordered: 25 September 1939
- Builder: Seebeckwerft, Wesermünde
- Yard number: 705
- Laid down: 6 December 1940
- Launched: 1 November 1941
- Commissioned: 23 March 1942
- Fate: Sunk, 30 July 1942

General characteristics
- Class & type: Type IXC submarine
- Displacement: 1,120 t (1,100 long tons) surfaced; 1,232 t (1,213 long tons) submerged
- Length: 76.76 m (251 ft 10 in) o/a; 58.75 m (192 ft 9 in) pressure hull
- Beam: 6.76 m (22 ft 2 in) o/a; 4.40 m (14 ft 5 in) pressure hull
- Height: 9.60 m (31 ft 6 in)
- Draught: 4.70 m (15 ft 5 in)
- Installed power: 4,400 PS (3,200 kW; 4,300 bhp) (diesels); 1,000 PS (740 kW; 990 shp) (electric)
- Propulsion: 2 shafts; 2 × diesel engines; 2 × electric motors
- Speed: 18.3 knots (33.9 km/h; 21.1 mph) surfaced; 7.7 knots (14.3 km/h; 8.9 mph) submerged
- Range: 13,450 nmi (24,910 km; 15,480 mi) at 10 knots (19 km/h; 12 mph) surfaced; 64 nmi (119 km; 74 mi) at 4 knots (7.4 km/h; 4.6 mph) submerged
- Test depth: 230 m (750 ft)
- Complement: 4 officers, 44 enlisted
- Armament: 6 × 53.3 cm (21 in) torpedo tubes (4 bow, 2 stern); 22 × torpedoes; 1 × 10.5 cm (4.1 in) SK C/32 deck gun (180 rounds); 1 × 3.7 cm (1.5 in) SK C/30 AA gun; 1 × twin 2 cm FlaK 30 AA guns

Service record
- Part of: 4th U-boat Flotilla; 23 March – 31 May 1942; 10th U-boat Flotilla; 1 June 1942 – 30 July 1942
- Identification codes: M 35 882
- Commanders: Oblt.z.S. Hans-Günther Kuhlmann; 23 March – 30 July 1942
- Operations: 2 patrols: 1st patrol: 1 – 10 June 1942; 2nd patrol: 17 June – 30 July 1942
- Victories: 4 merchant ships sunk (7,593 GRT)
- S.S. Robert E. Lee and U-166 (shipwrecks and remains)
- U.S. National Register of Historic Places
- Area: Adjacent to the SS Robert E. Lee shipwreck
- NRHP reference No.: 100002558
- Added to NRHP: 7 December 2018

German submarine U-166 was a Type IXC U-boat of Nazi Germany's Kriegsmarine during World War II. The submarine was laid down on 6 December 1940 at the Seebeckwerft (part of Deutsche Schiff- und Maschinenbau AG, Deschimag) at Wesermünde (modern Bremerhaven) as yard number 705, launched on 1 November 1941, and commissioned on 23 March 1942 under the command of Oberleutnant zur See Hans-Günther Kuhlmann. After training with the 4th U-boat Flotilla, U-166 was transferred to the 10th U-boat Flotilla for front-line service on 1 June 1942. The U-boat sailed on only two war patrols and sank four ships totalling 7,593 gross register tons (GRT). She was sunk on 30 July 1942 in the Gulf of Mexico.

== Design ==
German Type IXC submarines were slightly larger than the original Type IXBs. U-166 had a displacement of 1,120 tonnes (1,100 long tons) when at the surface and 1,232 tonnes (1,213 long tons) while submerged. The U-boat had a total length of 76.76 m (251 ft 10 in), a pressure hull length of 58.75 m (192 ft 9 in), a beam of 6.76 m (22 ft 2 in), a height of 9.60 m (31 ft 6 in), and a draught of 4.70 m (15 ft 5 in). The submarine was powered by two MAN M 9 V 40/46 supercharged four-stroke, nine-cylinder diesel engines producing a total of 4,400 metric horsepower (3,240 kW; 4,340 shp) for use while surfaced, and two Siemens-Schuckert 2 GU 345/34 double-acting electric motors producing a total of 1,000 metric horsepower (740 kW; 990 shp) for use while submerged. She had two shafts and two 1.92 metres (6 ft 4 in) propellers. The boat was capable of operating at depths down to 230 m (750 ft).

The submarine had a maximum surface speed of 18.3 kn (33.9 km/h; 21.1 mph) and a maximum submerged speed of 7.3 kn (13.5 km/h; 8.4 mph). When submerged, the boat could operate for 63 nmi (117 km; 72 mi) at 4 kn (7.4 km/h; 4.6 mph); when surfaced, she could travel 13,450 nmi (24,910 km; 15,480 mi) at 10 kn (19 km/h; 12 mph). U-166 was fitted with six 53.3 cm (21 in) torpedo tubes (four fitted at the bow and two at the stern), 22 torpedoes, one 10.5 cm (4.13 in) SK C/32 naval gun, 180 rounds, and a 3.7 cm (1.5 in) SK C/30, as well as a 2 cm (0.79 in) C/30 antiaircraft gun. The boat had a complement of 49.

== Service history ==
=== First patrol ===
U-166 first sailed from Kiel to Kristiansand, Norway, on 30–31 May 1942. The U-boat sailed on her first combat patrol, from Kristiansand on 1 June 1942, around the British Isles, and arrived at Lorient, France, 10 days later.

=== Second patrol ===
U-166 departed from Lorient on 17 June 1942, sailed across the Atlantic and into the Gulf of Mexico.

== Fate ==
On 30 July 1942, U-166 torpedoed the passenger steamer SS Robert E. Lee, which was under escort by the United States Navy PC-461-class submarine chaser PC-566 about 45 mi (72 km) south of the Mississippi River Delta. PC-566 immediately attacked, making her approach vector outside the view of U-166's periscope, and claimed to have sunk the U-boat with depth charges. Upon returning to port with the survivors of Robert E. Lee, the Navy did not believe the account provided by PC-566's skipper LCDR Herbert G. Claudius, USNR. Claudius' tactics were criticized, resulting in his reprimand and removal from seagoing command. A 2011 survey of the Gulf seabed indicated the U-boat was sunk by the depth charges discharged by the PC-566, and Herbert G. Claudius was posthumously awarded the Medal of Merit.

On 30 July 1942, a United States Coast Guard J4F-1 Widgeon amphibious aircraft spotted a U-boat around 100 mi (160 km) off the coast of Houma, Louisiana. The aircraft attacked and it appeared that the U-boat was hit in the attack. U-166 was reported missing in action on 30 July 1942, which coincided with the American aircraft's attack on "a U-Boat", leading to the aircraft being credited with the sinking of U-166, with the loss of all 52 crew members. Both aircraft crewmen were decorated for the action.

== Wreckage located in 2001 ==
In 2001, when the wreck of Robert E. Lee was located in more than 5,000 ft (1,500 m) of water, the wreck of U-166 was also located, less than 2 miles from where it had attacked her. An archaeological survey of the seafloor prior to construction of a natural gas pipeline led to the discoveries by C & C Marine archaeologists Robert A. Church and Daniel J. Warren. The sonar contacts consisted of two large sections lying roughly 500 ft apart at either end of a debris field that indicated the presence of a U-boat. Petroleum companies operating in the Gulf of Mexico's outer continental shelf are required to provide sonar data in areas that have archaeological potential. BP and Shell sponsored additional fieldwork to record detailed images, including a gun on the deck aft of the submarine's conning tower.

Charles "C.J." Christ, from Houma, spent most of his life searching for U-166 and was involved in the final identification of the U-boat.

In October 2003, Warren and Church led an archaeological and marine science team, along with marine surveyors to conducted a deep-water mapping project of the U-166 wreck site using a remotely operated vehicle (ROV). This project included combining archaeological methodology with a professional marine survey Long BaseLine (LBL) array to accurately map the entire wreck site including the main hull section, separated bow section and debris field. C. J. Christ was invited to accompany the team allowing him to finally visit the long sought after U-boat and lay a wreath between both wreck sites.

The site where U-166 lies, at 28°41′N 88°42′W, has been designated a war grave because its crew of 52 is entombed there. It is protected against any future attempts to salvage it.

Numerous additional surveys were conducted by the C&C Technologies team between 2004 and 2014. In 2013 C&C (now part of Oceaneering International) used their Autonomous Underwater Vehicle (AUV) to collect a three-dimensional laser scan at centimeter resolution and high resolution photography of the main hull and bow section. The survey results were instrumental for later analysis of the site.

Oceanographer and National Geographic Explorer-in-Residence Robert Ballard explored and mapped the wreck in the summer of 2014 with remotely operated vehicles, where they noticed that the submarine's bow had been blown off and was found resting on the seafloor 100 feet away from the main hull. They theorized that the bow of the submarine was destroyed, apparently by a depth charge that landed on the forward deck, exploded, and caused an internal detonation of the submarine's own torpedoes, which broke off the bow. If so, this would be one of the few successful submarine kills caused by direct contact from a depth charge, as typical attacks relied upon depth charges exploding a short distance away to inflict repeated hydraulic shocks that would eventually crack a submarine's pressure hull.

Initial credit for the sinking of U-166 had been given to a Grumman G-44 Widgeon, but the position of the wreck made it clear that this should have gone to the submarine chaser PC-566. On 16 December 2014, the Secretary of the Navy Ray Mabus posthumously awarded the captain of PC-566, then-LCDR Herbert G. Claudius, USNR (later CAPT USN), the Legion of Merit with a Combat "V" device for heroism in battle and credited him with the sinking of the U-boat. "Seventy years later, we now know that [Claudius's] report after the action was absolutely correct," he said. "[Claudius's ship] did sink that U-boat, and it's never too late to set the record straight."

Detailed analysis by Church and Warren based on eight professional deep-water marine surveys and six Remotely Operated Vehicle (ROV) investigations including six site visits as part of archaeological and scientific studies sponsored by U.S government agencies has revealed a more accurate picture of how the brief battle took place and that the sinking of U-166 was not just mere luck. The crew of PC-566 conducted two sequenced depth charge attacks that resulted in the ultimate destruction of the U-boat. As evident of the mathematical analysis of the historical accounts the patrol craft pursued the U-boat while its periscope was visible on the surface. As they closed on the U-boat’s position the periscope disappeared and the U-boat began to dive. The patrol craft began the first depth charge attack by dropping a 250-foot charge as they crossed the path at a 45 degree angle of the descending U-boat, followed 6 seconds later by a 100-foot charge from the aft rack and two 150-foot charges launched out to the sides from the K-guns. Then 6 more seconds later another 250-foot charge was rolled from the aft rack. The first charge would have passed behind the diving U-boat and detonated out of range, but either the 100-foot or the 150-foot starboard charge would have been descending ahead of the U-boats path and reached their detonation depths at approximately the same time the U-boat would have reached those same depths likely detonating near the hull and causing some damage to the pressure hull. The first attack alone however, did not sink the U-166 as it was noted to have been relocated 10 minutes later having changed course to a northern heading and fleeing away from the scene. PC-566 reengaged with a second depth charge attack that finished off the U-boat as is evident from the oil slick observed shortly after at the location of the second attack.

The physical evidence at the wreck site indicates that the wreck broke apart near its crush depth of 755 feet (230 m) with the main hull continuing down on a northerly heading and the separated bow section spiraling downward with both sections of hull spilling debris as they rapidly descended. Substantial impact craters are observed where both section of hull imbedded into the seafloor. The substantial damage of the bow is likely from the combination of the two depth charge attacks, a possible internal explosion near the bow section, and the abrupt impact with the seafloor.

Results of a study released in February 2019 showed that the wreck of U-166 was being badly damaged because of the 2010 Deepwater Horizon oil spill. Seabed bacteria, feeding on the oil, were causing the damage.

== Summary of raiding history ==
Date	Ship Name	Nationality	Tonnage (GRT)	Fate	Position	Deaths
11 July 1942	Carmen	Dominican Republic	84	Sunk	19°43′N 70°12′W	1
13 July 1942	Oneida	United States	2,309	Sunk	20°17′N 74°06′W	6
16 July 1942	Gertrude	United States	16	Sunk	23°32′N 82°00′W	0
30 July 1942	Robert E. Lee	United States	5,184	Sunk	28°40′N 88°42′W	25

== Note ==
- One of the foremost authorities on the subject is Charles "C.J." Christ, from Houma, who spent most of his life searching for U-166. His personal account about his search and the final locating and identification of the U-boat can be found in a local newspaper, The Houma Courier: C.J. Christ "WAR IN THE GULF: German submarine, U-166, found in the Gulf of Mexico" (The article can be found online as reprint by another local newspaper, The Daily Comet).
