= List of shipwrecks in 1910 =

The list of shipwrecks in 1910 includes ships sunk, foundered, grounded, or otherwise lost during 1910.

table of contents
1910
Jan	Feb	Mar	Apr
May	Jun	Jul	Aug
Sep	Oct	Nov	Dec
Unknown date

== January ==
=== 1 January ===
List of shipwrecks: 1 January 1910
Ship	State	Description
Katie Darling	United Kingdom	The ketch foundered off Cardigan. Two crew were rescued by Elizabeth Austin ( Royal National Lifeboat Institution).
Mill Boy	United States	The steamer was sunk by ice in the Missouri River two miles (3 km) east of Washington, Missouri.

=== 3 January ===
List of shipwrecks: 3 January 1910
Ship	State	Description
New Haven	United States	The steamer was destroyed by ice at Uniontown, Kentucky.

=== 4 January ===
List of shipwrecks: 4 January 1910
Ship	State	Description
Emily	United States	The laid up steamer was sunk by ice at Portsmouth, Ohio.

=== 5 January ===
List of shipwrecks: 5 January 1910
Ship	State	Description
Farallon	United States	During a voyage from Valdez, District of Alaska, to Unalaska in the Aleutian Islands and way ports with eight passengers, a crew of 30, and a cargo of 30 tons of general merchandise aboard, the 749-gross register ton, 158.5-foot (48.3 m) passenger steamer was wrecked without loss of life on a reef in Cook Inlet on the south-central coast of the District of Alaska. Her passengers and crew survived for 29 days on an island until rescued by the steamer Victoria (flag unknown) on 3 February 1910.

=== 6 January ===
List of shipwrecks: 6 January 1910
Ship	State	Description
Dallas	United States	The U. S. Government steamer burned in the Trinity River just south of Dallas, Texas.
Edwin Terry	United States	The steamer ran aground in heavy fog on Man of War Rock in the East River off 42nd Street, New York City, New York, and sank.

=== 7 January ===
List of shipwrecks: 7 January 1910
Ship	State	Description
J. C. Mallonee	United States	The steamer burned at Darien, Georgia.

=== 8 January ===
List of shipwrecks: 8 January 1910
Ship	State	Description
American	United States	The tow steamer was sunk in a collision in the Delaware River off the League Island Navy Yard with Chicago (United States). Raised and proceeded in the direction of Camden, New Jersey, and sank again (date unclear).

=== 9 January ===
List of shipwrecks: 9 January 1910
Ship	State	Description
New Haven	United States	The steamer struck a heavy drift and sank in the Tombigbee River just below Demopolis, Alabama.

=== 10 January ===
List of shipwrecks: 10 January 1910
Ship	State	Description
Edna	United States	The towing steamer, tied up at Pier 15 in the North River off 42nd Street, New York City, was holed by ice and sank. Later raised and repaired.
Leader	United States	The steamer was sunk by ice at Brandenburg, Kentucky, on the Ohio River.

=== 11 January ===
List of shipwrecks: 11 January 1910
Ship	State	Description
City of Bristol	United Kingdom	The 115-foot (35 m), 214-ton steam trawler ran aground in a storm on Sheep Island, off Ballintoy, County Antrim, United Kingdom. She got off but foundered in Larrybane Bay.
Hadrian	United Kingdom	The steamer was anchored in the Humber off Grimsby when she was struck by the German mail steamer Mecklenburg and sank within twenty minutes. One crew member drowned.

=== 12 January ===
List of shipwrecks: 12 January 1910
Ship	State	Description
Czarina	United States	The collier foundered in heavy seas crossing the Coos Bay Bar. 23 crewmen and 1 passenger killed. One crewman was the sole survivor.

=== 14 January ===
List of shipwrecks: 14 January 1910
Ship	State	Description
Chatham	United States	The cargo ship sank partially submerged at the entrance to the St. Johns River, Florida, after striking the North Jerry.
City of Providence	United States	The steamer was pushed on to the river bank by ice in the Mississippi River just outside the city limits of St. Louis, Missouri. During an attempt to refloat her on 20 January she suddenly slipped off the bank and sank.
Florence	United States	The ferry steamer was pushed on to the river bank and wrecked by ice in the Mississippi River at St. Louis, Missouri.

=== 15 January ===
List of shipwrecks: 15 January 1910
Ship	State	Description
Annie O'Donnell	United States	The coal boat was sunk by ice off Barren Island, Brooklyn, in New York Bay.

=== 16 January ===
List of shipwrecks: 16 January 1910
Ship	State	Description
Tourist	United States	The steamer filled with water and sank at her dock on the Calumet River.

=== 17 January ===
List of shipwrecks: 17 January 1910
Ship	State	Description
Estelle Randall	United States	The steamer burned at Norfolk, Virginia. One crewman killed.
Florence Belle	United States	The laid up tow steamer was sunk by ice at Creighton, Pennsylvania, on the Allegheny River.

=== 18 January ===
List of shipwrecks: 18 January 1910
Ship	State	Description
Daylight	United States	The schooner was sunk in a collision with Anna W. (United States) in New York Bay near the Quickstep bell buoy.
Willard	United States	The steam tug was sunk by ice at Ambridge, Pennsylvania, on the Ohio River.

=== 19 January ===
List of shipwrecks: 19 January 1910
Ship	State	Description
H. P. Dilworth	United States	The laid up tow steamer burned at Rices Landing, Pennsylvania.
Unknown scow	United States	A scow had to be beached after a collision with W. N. Bavier (United States) in the North River at the 79th street pier.

=== 20 January ===
List of shipwrecks: 20 January 1910
Ship	State	Description
Triton	United Kingdom	The 103-foot (31 m) steam trawler sank 20 miles south southwest of Blackball Head. Crew pulled for Berehaven, or Castletown, County Cork, Ireland, UK in her boat, arriving the next day.

=== 22 January ===
List of shipwrecks: 22 January 1910
Ship	State	Description
City of Bristol	United Kingdom	The 115-foot (35 m) trawler struck the Scurra Reef in thick fog between the mainland and Sheep Island, Ballintoy, County Antrim, Ireland, U.K.. She later floated off, but sank in Larrybane Bay (55°14′N 06°20′W).
Indefatigable	United Kingdom	Under tow from Falmouth, Cornwall to Cardiff by the tug Challenge, they hit heavy weather at Land's End and returned to Falmouth. During the night Indefatigable dragged her anchors and drifted ashore under St Mawes Castle. She was pulled off the rocks by tugs Briton, Dragon and Marian, towed to Falmouth Docks and sold for scrap.
James Moren	United States	The tow steamer collided with the wall of lock No. 5 at Freedom, Pennsylvania, and sank. Raised and repaired.

=== 23 January ===
List of shipwrecks: 23 January 1910
Ship	State	Description
Mertie B. Crowley	United States	Carrying a cargo of coal, the 297-foot (91 m), 2,824-gross register ton six-masted schooner was wrecked on Wasque Shoal off Wasque Point, or on Skiffs Island Shoal off Chappaquiddick, Martha's Vineyard off the coast of Massachusetts. She broke up 2 February. Her captain, his wife and the rest of the crew were rescued from her masts.
Newburgh	United States	The barge was sunk in a collision with a lighter in the East River at Pier 52 in New York City.

=== 24 January ===
List of shipwrecks: 24 January 1910
Ship	State	Description
Archibald Watt	United States	The towing steamer was sunk in a collision with the propeller of Re D' Italia (Italy) at Pier B Jersey City, New Jersey.

=== 25 January ===
List of shipwrecks: 25 January 1910
Ship	State	Description
Lloyd	United States	The motor vessel was crushed by ice in Carroll County, Missouri one mile (1.6 km) above Miami, Missouri.

=== 26 January ===
List of shipwrecks: 26 January 1910
Ship	State	Description
Gothic	United Kingdom	The 105.6-foot (32.2 m), 153-ton steam trawler was damaged in a storm force blizzard on 25 January, losing her wheelhouse, funnel, and boat. The fishing steamer Oldham (United Kingdom) rescued four crew before her boat was smashed and sank. She rescued five crew on the morning of 26 January, one of whom was found to be dead, just before Gothic sank in the North Sea.
Unknown canal boat	United States	A canal boat, one of nine being towed by John Rugge (United States), was carried by a flood tide into piers 48 and 49 on the East River causing her to sink.

=== 29 January ===
List of shipwrecks: 29 January 1910
Ship	State	Description
Echo	United States	The vessel struck a snag and sank at the entrance to the Trinity River. Raised on 2 February.
Southport	United States	The passenger steamer sank in a collision with Mercur (United States Army) in the Cape Fear River off Orton, North Carolina.

=== Unknown date ===
List of shipwrecks: unknown January 1910
Ship	State	Description
Mercur	Norway	The 167.6-foot (51.1 m), 536-ton cargo vessel departed from Drammen, Norway for Rochester, Kent, United Kingdom and vanished.

== February ==
=== 1 February ===
List of shipwrecks: 1 February 1910
Ship	State	Description
Betty Owen	United States	The steamer was damaged by grounding at Brookport, Illinois, but continued down stream. She was found later to be badly leaking and sank in shallow water and then caught fire and burned.
J. Henry Edmunds	United States	The schooner was sunk by a run away mud scow in the South Channel of New York Bay.

=== 2 February ===
List of shipwrecks: 2 February 1910
Ship	State	Description
Jewel	United States	The steamer burned at the mouth of the Green River.

=== 3 February ===
List of shipwrecks: 3 February 1910
Ship	State	Description
Diamond	United States	The passenger steamer grounded in the Ohio River near Elmsworth, Pennsylvania, she flooded and sank. Raised and repaired.

=== 4 February ===
List of shipwrecks: 4 February 1910
Ship	State	Description
Kentucky	United States	The steamer foundered off Hatteras, North Carolina, or over 200 miles (320 km) off Savanna, Georgia. All on board rescued by Alamo (United States).
Rowena	United States	The steamer struck an obstruction at Ford's Island in the Cumberland River nine miles (14 km) below Burnside, Kentucky. She was beached on a sand bar and sank in shallow water. Raised, repaired and returned to service on 8 February.

=== 5 February ===
List of shipwrecks: 5 February 1910
Ship	State	Description
Tom Rees No. 2	United States	The tow steamer sprung a leak in the Ohio River above Clusters Islands, she flooded and sank in 20 feet (6.1 m) of water.

=== 6 February ===
List of shipwrecks: 6 February 1910
Ship	State	Description
Martha Helen	United States	The towing steamer burned at Jacksonville, Florida. One crewman killed.
USS Nina	United States Navy	The submarine tender, a former tugboat, sank in a gale in 90 feet (27 m) of water on Fenwick Island Shoals 11 miles (18 km) north north east of Ocean City, Maryland. Lost with all 31 crew.

=== 8 February ===
List of shipwrecks: 8 February 1910
Ship	State	Description
Margaret Irving	United States	The canal boat was sunk by ice in Newark Bay between the Newark Bay Light and the Bell Buoy.

=== 9 February ===
List of shipwrecks: 9 February 1910
Ship	State	Description
Unknown barge	United States	A barge was sunk in a collision with A. C. Rose (United States) off Pier 1 in the East River.

=== 10 February ===
List of shipwrecks: 10 February 1910
Ship	State	Description
Belle of the Bends	United States	The steamer either sank in a snowstorm, or ran aground in a snowstorm and sank after leaving Fitler's Landing, 20 miles (32 km) below Lake Providence, or after leaving Hayes Landing in the Mississippi River. Raised, repaired and returned to service.
Kentucky	United States	The steamer was abandoned in heavy seas in sinking conditions.
Restless	United States	The 9-gross register ton, 31-foot (9.4 m) yawl was wrecked off the northern end of Prince of Wales Island in the Alexander Archipelago in Southeast Alaska. Her captain fell overboard and was lost about six hours before Restless was wrecked; the only other person aboard survived the wreck.

=== 14 February ===
List of shipwrecks: 14 February 1910
Ship	State	Description
Unknown barge	United States	A barge was damaged in a collision with City of Fall River (United States) off Halletts Point in the East River causing the barge to be beached.

=== 16 February ===
List of shipwrecks: 16 February 1910
Ship	State	Description
Magic City	United States	The steamer was sunk in a collision with Parthian (United States) between the No. 2 and No. 4 buoys in the St. Johns River near Mayport, Florida.
Yucatan	United States	Sources differ on the details of the wreck of Yucatan. According to one source, during a voyage in the District of Alaska from Cordova to Juneau with 60 passengers and a crew of 84 aboard, the 3,525-gross register ton, 336-foot (102.4 m) schooner-rigged steamer was beached without loss of life to prevent her from sinking after an iceberg struck her bow and holed her hull while she was stopped off Mud Bay in Icy Strait in the Alexander Archipelago in the District of Alaska. Passengers were transferred to the steamer Georgia (United States). Declared a constructive total loss, Yucatan was refloated, repaired, and returned to service as Shinkai Maru (Japan). According to another source, Yucatan struck an iceberg between Goose Island and Gull Cove while underway in Icy Strait in the Alexander Archipelago in the District if Alaska in a snowstorm. After striking the iceberg she struck a reef and bounced off of it. She sank one mile (1.6 km) from the collision site in 35 feet (11 m) of water with her upper works above water. She was heavily damaged by storms from the time of her sinking until raised in June 1910. Repaired in 1911 at Hall Brothers Shipyard in Eagle Harbor, Washington.

=== 17 February ===
List of shipwrecks: 17 February 1910
Ship	State	Description
Columbia	United States	The laid up passenger steamer burned at Camden, Pennsylvania, on the Monongahela River.
Minnie Georges	United States	The tug burned to the waterline in Sweet Bay Lake, Louisiana.
Queen City	United States	The steamer sank in the Chattahoochee River at a wharf at Columbus, Georgia.

=== 19 February ===
List of shipwrecks: 19 February 1910
Ship	State	Description
Arthur D. Bissell	United States	The canal boat was sunk by ice in the harbor at New Haven, Connecticut. Later raised.

=== 21 February ===
List of shipwrecks: 21 February 1910
Ship	State	Description
C. H. Hugo	United States	The steamer sank at Memphis, Tennessee, from unknown causes.

=== 23 February ===
List of shipwrecks: 23 February 1910
Ship	State	Description
Champion	United States	The steamer sunk at her berth at Ironton, Ohio, due to a broke plank.
La Boulonaisse	France	The 67-ton ship carrying cement from Boulogne to Saint Malo sank on a reef of the Chausey Islands Channel Islands. Five men were saved.

=== 24 February ===
List of shipwrecks: 24 February 1910
Ship	State	Description
Ava	United Kingdom	The 107-foot (33 m), 162-ton steam trawler sank in the North Sea.
Columbia	United States	The steamer burned at dock at Moss Side near Camden, Ohio.

=== 25 February ===
List of shipwrecks: 25 February 1910
Ship	State	Description
Orville A. Crandall	United States	The freighter was sunk by ice in the Branford River in eight feet (2.4 m) of water. Raised later.
Wisconsin	United States	The passenger-freighter burned to the waterline in the Chicago River.

=== 26 February ===
List of shipwrecks: 26 February 1910
Ship	State	Description
Columbia	United States	The steamer struck a snag and sank at Bayou Sara, Louisiana.
Unknown barges	United States	Three barges broke lose from their tow in Hell Gate and struck rocks causing one to sink near Hunt's Point and two of the barges to be beached.

=== 27 February ===
List of shipwrecks: 27 February 1910
Ship	State	Description
Earnest Rudolph	United States	The freighter burned and sank at the foot of 22nd Street, Bath Beach, New York.
Hugh J. Derby	United States	The barge foundered in heavy seas in Long Island Sound 1 1/4 miles (2 km) southeast of Bridgeport Light. Raised later.
Mamie	United States	The steamer sank at Memphis, Tennessee, from unknown causes. Raised 16 June.

=== 28 February ===
List of shipwrecks: 28 February 1910
Ship	State	Description
Nordenskjold	Russia	The Russian wooden brigantine, on voyage from La Rochelle to Llanelly with a cargo of pit props, was wrecked in Belgrave Bay (Belle Grève), Guernsey Channel Islands.

== March ==
=== 2 March ===
List of shipwrecks: 2 March 1910
Ship	State	Description
M. Tuttle	United States	The laid up steam sand dredge was crushed by ice and sank at Perrysburg, Ohio, in the Maumee River.

=== 3 March ===
List of shipwrecks: 3 March 1910
Ship	State	Description
No. 21	United States	The canal boat was sunk in a collision with New York City Fire Department fireboat The New Yorker (United States) in the North River, her tow vessel was tied up to Pier 1.
Tinsley Brothers	United States	The canal boat was sunk in a collision with New York City Fire Department Fireboat The New Yorker (United States) in the North River, her tow vessel was tied up to Pier 1.

=== 5 March ===
List of shipwrecks: 5 March 1910
Ship	State	Description
Dove	United States	The motor boat caught fire and was scuttled at Enterprise, South Carolina.

=== 6 March ===
List of shipwrecks: 6 March 1910
Ship	State	Description
Geraldine	United States	The steamer was holed by a log in the Big Sandy River and was beached to prevent sinking.

=== 7 March ===
List of shipwrecks: 7 March 1910
Ship	State	Description
Hunter No. 2	United States	The steamer burned in the Monongahela River above Dravosburg, Pennsylvania, due to a failure in the boiler.
Manhattan	United States	The steamer caught fire at Portland, Maine. She was towed away from dock and beached at South Portland where she burned to below the main deck. One crewman killed.

=== 8 March ===
List of shipwrecks: 8 March 1910
Ship	State	Description
Ann Arbor No. 1	United States	The car ferry burned to the waterline while moored at Manitowoc, Wisconsin. To extinguish the flames, she was scuttled in 15 feet (4.6 m) of water. Deemed a hazard to navigation, she was refloated on 9 June 1911 and rebuilt as a sandsucker barge.

=== 11 March ===
List of shipwrecks: 11 March 1910
Ship	State	Description
Garrison	United States	The motor vessel was sunk by ice at Big Bend, North Dakota.

=== 13 March ===
List of shipwrecks: 13 March 1910
Ship	State	Description
Expansion	United States	The steamer was sunk by ice at Bismarck, North Dakota, on the Missouri River.
Harry	United Kingdom	The Brixham trawler was stranded at Porthcurno, Cornwall and taken in tow by the Sennen Cove lifeboat Ann Newbon ( Royal National Lifeboat Institution).

=== 15 March ===
List of shipwrecks: 15 March 1910
Ship	State	Description
R. L. Aubrey	United States	The steamer was sunk in the Ohio River when her boilers exploded off Arctic Springs, Indiana. One or 3 killed, and 3 or 5 injured.

=== 21 March ===
List of shipwrecks: 21 March 1910
Ship	State	Description
William Fletcher	United States	The tow steamer's hull was holed by an unknown object causing her to sink in shallow water off Governor's Island. Later raised, repaired and returned to service.

=== 25 March ===
List of shipwrecks: 25 March 1910
Ship	State	Description
Frank	United States	The towing steamer sank at Jacksonville, Florida. Raised the next day.

=== 28 March ===
List of shipwrecks: 28 March 1910
Ship	State	Description
Stanley	United States	Carrying a cargo of 150 tons of salt, lumber, and provisions, the 355-gross register ton, 143.3-foot (43.7 m) schooner was wrecked at the entrance to Pavlof Harbor on Sanak Island in the Fox Islands in the eastern Aleutian Islands. Four of her eight crew members were lost.

=== 30 March ===
List of shipwrecks: 30 March 1910
Ship	State	Description
Iceland	United Kingdom	The sealer was crushed by ice off Newfoundland. As the crew abandoned her she was set on fire.

=== 31 March ===
List of shipwrecks: 31 March 1910
Ship	State	Description
Pericles	United Kingdom	The ocean liner struck an uncharted rock near Cape Leeuwin, Western Australia, and sank. All 238 passengers and 163 crew members abandoned ship safely.

== April ==
=== 4 April ===
List of shipwrecks: 4 April 1910
Ship	State	Description
Kensington	United States	The tow steamer was swept by a flood tide in Hell Gate into a dredge and scow at Mill Rock in the East River causing her to capsize and sink.

=== 7 April ===
List of shipwrecks: 7 April 1910
Ship	State	Description
E. W. Edwards	United States	The steamer flooded and sank at Reedville, Virginia, due to water coming through the siphons. Refloated the next day
Estelle	United States	The motor launch was sunk in a collision with Pearl (United States) in the Madmalaw River in South Carolina.

=== 11 April ===
List of shipwrecks: 11 April 1910
Ship	State	Description
D. D. Calvin	Canada	The steamer was destroyed by fire at Garden Island, Ontario.

=== 12 April ===
List of shipwrecks: 12 April 1910
Ship	State	Description
Unknown float	United States	A float sank in the East River at the foot of Grand Street, New York City from a hole in her hull.

=== 15 April ===
List of shipwrecks: 15 April 1910
Ship	State	Description
Notre Dame de Lourdes	France	The ketch was driven ashore at Rhosilli, Glamorgan, United Kingdom. Her crew survived but the vessel subsequently broke up.
No. 6	Imperial Japanese Navy	The Type 6 submarine sank in 10 fathoms (60 ft; 18 m) of water in Hiroshima Bay off Kure due to a faulty ventilator valve. Lost with all 16 crew. Raised the next day, repaired and returned to service.

=== 17 April ===
List of shipwrecks: 17 April 1910
Ship	State	Description
Defiance	United States	The tow steamer, laid up at the foot of Court Street, Brooklyn, New York, was sunk when Henry Lee (United States) capsized on her and sank.
Henry Lee	United States	The tow steamer, laid up at the foot of Court Street, Brooklyn, New York, capsized on Defiance (United States) and sank.

=== 18 April ===
List of shipwrecks: 18 April 1910
Ship	State	Description
Brabo	Belgium	The steamer ran aground on Hoburger, off the coast of Sweden.
Minnehaha	United Kingdom	The ocean liner ran aground on rocks in the Isles of Scilly. Refloated on 13 May and returned to service after repairs were made.

=== 19 April ===
List of shipwrecks: 19 April 1910
Ship	State	Description
Gypsum	United States	The steamer struck rocks in the East River at Hell Gate and sank.
Reliable	United States	The tug ran aground in the harbor of East New Rochelle. She was then hit by three scows she was towing, causing her to over turn. This caused a stove to overturn and the resulting fire destroyed the tug.
Sonoma	United States	The steamer sank in 6 feet (1.8 m) of water below Luke Chute on the Muskingum River.

=== 22 April ===
List of shipwrecks: 22 April 1910
Ship	State	Description
Unknown motor boat	United States	A motor boat capsized and sank in a collision with a barge in the Cuyahoga River. One of five on board was killed.

=== 25 April ===
List of shipwrecks: 25 April 1910
Ship	State	Description
Kate	Canada	The tug burned above the Soo Rapids.

=== 29 April ===
List of shipwrecks: 29 April 1910
Ship	State	Description
Bob Dudley	United States	The steamer sank at Nashville, Tennessee. Later raised and repaired.

== May ==
=== 3 May ===
List of shipwrecks: 3 May 1910
Ship	State	Description
Santuree	United States	The steamer collided with Ligonier (United States) in thick fog ten miles (16 km) southeast of the Highland Light off Cape Cod in the Atlantic Ocean. She was beached at Provincetown to avoid sinking.

=== 11 May ===
List of shipwrecks: 11 May 1910
Ship	State	Description
City of Saltillo	United States	The steamer struck rocks on the Missouri side of the Mississippi River near Glen Cove, Missouri, and sank. 7 passengers and 5 crewmen killed.

=== 10 May ===
List of shipwrecks: 10 May 1910
Ship	State	Description
Ford City	United States	The steamer rolled over and sank while being hauled out for dry docking at Pittsburgh, Pennsylvania. Raised and repaired.
Lizzie S. Sorenson	United States	The 76.1-gross register ton, 84.2-foot (25.7 m) motor whaling schooner sank in Iphigenia Bay (55°26′15″N 133°24′15″W) in Southeast Alaska 8 nautical miles (15 km) southwest of Cape Addington (55°26′28.1″N 133°49′03″W) after a whale her crew had harpooned rammed her and stove in her hull. Her crew of seven reached shore in a ship's boat, and the tug Fearless (United States) rescued all crew on 12 May.

=== 13 May ===
List of shipwrecks: 13 May 1910
Ship	State	Description
Eddie A. Minot	United States	The fishing schooner sank in a collision with J. S. T. Stranahan (United States) off 24th Street, Brooklyn, New York.

=== 14 May ===
List of shipwrecks: 14 May 1910
Ship	State	Description
Reliable	United States	The steamer sank at her dock in the Milwaukee River.
Saint Michael #6	United States	The 240-ton barge was destroyed by ice on the Tanana River in the central part of the District of Alaska.

=== 15 May ===
List of shipwrecks: 15 May 1910
Ship	State	Description
Brittania	United States	The barge was stranded on Block Island, Rhode Island, after colliding with her tow, the tug Bay City (United States).
Wear	United Kingdom	The British steel cargo ship Wear, built in 1905 by Austin S. P. & Son Ltd. and owned at the time of her loss by Witherington & Everett SS Co., on voyage from Sunderland to Saint-Servan with a cargo of coal, was wrecked on the west coast of Guernsey Channel Islands. There were no casualties.

=== 17 May ===
List of shipwrecks: 17 May 1910
Ship	State	Description
Faustin	United States	The steamer sank in heavy weather in 14 feet (4.3 m) of water in Lake Erie off Barr Point one mile (1.6 km) east of the Barr Point Lightship. Ship was raised.
Forel	Imperial Russian Navy	The submarine sank accidentally. All crew members escaped. Forel later was salvaged and scrapped.

=== 18 May ===
List of shipwrecks: 18 May 1910
Ship	State	Description
J. Marhoffer	United States	The steamer burned 14 miles (23 km) north of the Yaquina Lighthouse on the Oregon coast. One crewman killed.
Uncle Sam	United States	The passenger steamer was beached and sank after a collision with a dredge and scow at Kansas City, Missouri.

=== 19 May ===
List of shipwrecks: 19 May 1910
Ship	State	Description
Cisco	United States	The fishing tug caught fire ten miles (16 km) west of Sleeping Bear Point, Lake Michigan. Her crew was unable to put out the fire and the vessel was run aground one-half mile (0.8 km) offshore.
C. M. Johnston	United States	The steamer sank at the mouth of the White River.

=== 20 May ===
List of shipwrecks: 20 May 1910
Ship	State	Description
Union	United States	The steamer burned in Hood's Canal, Thorndyke Bay.

=== 21 May ===
List of shipwrecks: 21 May 1910
Ship	State	Description
John B. Ketchum No.2	United States	The steamer struck the east crib of the Neebish Cut in the St. Marys River and sank. Raised and taken to Bay City, Michigan, for repairs.

=== 23 May ===
List of shipwrecks: 23 May 1910
Ship	State	Description
Frank H. Goodyear	United States	The steamer broke in two and sunk in a collision in thick fog with James B. Wood (United States) in Lake Huron 40 miles (64 km) below Thunder Bay Island. 18 crewmen were killed, along with the wife and 3-year-old son of the cook, who survived.
James S. T. Stranahan	United States	The steamer caught fire in the East River, and was abandoned. She drifted near Clasons Point, Bronx and sank.

=== 24 May ===
List of shipwrecks: 24 May 1910
Ship	State	Description
USS Dewey	United States Navy	The drydock sank at the U.S. Naval Base Subic Bay, Philippines, while filled to receive a Torpedo Boat. Refloated on 29 June undamaged.

=== 25 May ===
List of shipwrecks: 25 May 1910
Ship	State	Description
James T. Morse	United States	The steamer was sunk in a collision by Belfast (United States) at Rockland, Maine.
Mizpah	United States	The 64-gross register ton, 70-foot (21.3 m) motor schooner was destroyed by an explosion and fire at Kvichak (58°58′N 156°56′W) on the Bristol Bay coast of the District of Alaska.

=== 26 May ===
List of shipwrecks: 26 May 1910
Ship	State	Description
Pluviôse	French Navy	The submarine sank with the loss of her entire crew of 27 after colliding with the packet boat Pas de Calais (France) in the Strait of Dover off Calais, France. She was refloated, repaired, and returned to service.

=== 28 May ===
List of shipwrecks: 28 May 1910
Ship	State	Description
Paul L	United States	The steamer sank at a dock at Oshkosh, Wisconsin.

=== 30 May ===
List of shipwrecks: 30 May 1910
Ship	State	Description
Forward	United States	The schooner foundered in Kewaunee Bay, Lake Michigan.
Olivia	United Kingdom	The fishing trawler was hit by the torpedo boat destroyer HMS Quail (Royal Navy) off Porthallow, Cornwall. Four men from the village of Flushing died.

== June ==
=== 1 June ===
List of shipwrecks: 1 June 1910
Ship	State	Description
Evergreen	United States	The steamer sank with 4 feet (1.2 m) of water on her deck at Buffalo, West Virginia.

=== 4 June ===
List of shipwrecks: 4 June 1910
Ship	State	Description
Lucy V.	United States	The inland passenger steamer burned at Bucksport, South Carolina.

=== 7 June ===
List of shipwrecks: 7 June 1910
Ship	State	Description
Bertha	United States	The 13-gross register ton motor schooner was crushed in ice in the Bering Sea 22 nautical miles (41 km) west of Carter (59°17′N 161°56′W) on the west-central coast of the District of Alaska. Her crew of three survived. She drifted ashore on 20 June and her gasoline engine was salvaged, but otherwise she was a total loss.
Biscayne	United States	The steamer sank in 3 1/2 feet (1 m) of water. Location unknown.
Felix de Abasolo	Spain	Carrying a cargo of coal, she ran aground in dense fog on Les Boufresses reef just north of Île de Raz Alderney Channel Islands and broke her back.

=== 8 June ===
List of shipwrecks: 8 June 1910
Ship	State	Description
Rover	United States	The steamer was rolled and wrecked by a tow towed by Henry Lourey (United States) at Pennsylvania Lock No. 2 on the Ohio River.
Unknown scow	United States	A scow was sunk by an obstruction off Round Rock, Branford, Connecticut.

=== 9 June ===
List of shipwrecks: 9 June 1910
Ship	State	Description
Apache	United States	The steam yacht sank in shallow water after hitting the breakwater while leaving Cleveland, Ohio.

=== 10 June ===
List of shipwrecks: 10 June 1910
Ship	State	Description
Black Prince	United States	The steamer struck a snag in the Skagit River and sank. Later raised and repaired.
Majestic	United States	The barge sank 14 miles (23 km) south southeast of the Highland Light, New Jersey. The barge's captain was killed when her lifeboat capsized, everyone else was rescued by the barge's tow steamer Harold (United States).

=== 11 June ===
List of shipwrecks: 11 June 1910
Ship	State	Description
Cape Girardeau	United States	The steamer struck an obstruction in the Mississippi River near Turkey Island. She was beached, but sank.
Rap	Norway	The Norwegian cargo ship was on a voyage from Newcastle to Gibraltar with a cargo of coal, when she was wrecked, off Alderney, Channel Islands.
Terra	United Kingdom	En route from the Port of Tyne to Genoa with a cargo of coal. She ran aground in fog at Chateau Letoc, Alderney Channel Islands
Unknown barge	United States	A barge sank in a collision with Bornu (United States) in Hell Gate. The barge's captain was killed.

=== 15 June ===
List of shipwrecks: 15 June 1910
Ship	State	Description
J. Dallas Marviel	United States	The sailing vessel was sunk in a collision with Everett (United States) off Sandy Point in the Chesapeake Bay.

=== 16 June ===
List of shipwrecks: 16 June 1910
Ship	State	Description
Norumbega	United States	The schooner collided with Mills (United States) in thick fog 30 miles (48 km) from the Fire Island Lightship off Cape Cod in the Atlantic Ocean. She was abandoned due to heavy damage.

=== 18 June ===
List of shipwrecks: 18 June 1910
Ship	State	Description
Cheapside	United Kingdom	The collier collided with the armoured cruiser HMS King Alfred off Start Point and sank. King Alfred received little damage.
Linn O-Dee	United Kingdom	The iron cargo ship, on voyage from Portsmouth to Guernsey in ballast, ran aground in fog and was wrecked at La Lague on Burhou Island, close to Alderney, Channel Islands.

=== 19 June ===
List of shipwrecks: 19 June 1910
Ship	State	Description
Lola	United States	The steamer filled with water after hitting bottom in Calumet Lake and sank in 3 1/2 feet (1.1 m) of water.

=== 20 June ===
List of shipwrecks: 20 June 1910
Ship	State	Description
William C. Redfield	United States	The steamer burned at Athens, New York.

=== 21 June ===
List of shipwrecks: 21 June 1910
Ship	State	Description
Joe Mathews	United States	During a voyage from Nome to Golovin, District of Alaska, with 19 passengers, a crew of three, and a cargo of 15 tons of lumber on board, the 31-gross register ton, 45.8-foot (14.0 m) motor vessel was destroyed by ice in Norton Sound 3 nautical miles (6 km) northwest of Cape Darby (64°19′N 162°47′W). All on board survived.

=== 23 June ===
List of shipwrecks: 23 June 1910
Ship	State	Description
Zelandia	Belgium	The vessel sprang a leak and foundered in the North Sea 100 nautical miles (190 km) off the Danish coast.

=== 24 June ===
List of shipwrecks: 24 June 1910
Ship	State	Description
C. W. Elphicke	United States	The tugboat was sunk at Michigan City when United States (United States) collided with a bridge causing it to collapse onto the tugboat.

=== 25 June ===
List of shipwrecks: 25 June 1910
Ship	State	Description
J. S.	United States	The steamer burned in the Mississippi River at Victory, Wisconsin. Two passengers killed.

=== 26 June ===
List of shipwrecks: 26 June 1910
Ship	State	Description
Poughkeepsie	United States	The steamer burned at Highland, New York.

=== 27 June ===
List of shipwrecks: 27 June 1910
Ship	State	Description
Albania	United States	The tugboat burned in the Sabine-Neches Canal.

=== Unknown date ===
List of shipwrecks: Unknown date June 1910
Ship	State	Description
Bob	United States	The 8-ton, 33.9-foot (10.3 m) schooner sank at Juneau, District of Alaska, and became a total loss.
Raymond	United States	The tug sank in the Connecticut River near Middlehaddam, Connecticut, probably in June.

== July ==
=== 9 July ===
List of shipwrecks: 9 July 1910
Ship	State	Description
Annie E. Smale	United States	The schooner was wrecked in dense fog at Point Reyes, California. Everyone on board was rescued from their lifeboat by F. M. Plant (United States).

=== 10 July ===
List of shipwrecks: 10 July 1910
Ship	State	Description
Charles Castle	United States	The steamer sank at her dock at the foot of Eighth Street, Detroit, Michigan.

=== 11 July ===
List of shipwrecks: 11 July 1910
Ship	State	Description
USS Castine	United States Navy	The submarine tender was beached near North Truro, Massachusetts, after a collision with USS Bonita (United States Navy). Later refloated, repaired and returned to service.

=== 13 July ===
List of shipwrecks: 13 July 1910
Ship	State	Description
Helen Blair	United States	The steamer struck an obstruction in the Mississippi River 3 1/2 miles (5.6 km) below Davenport, Iowa, and sank in 7 feet (2.1 m) of water. She was raised and repaired.

=== 14 July ===
List of shipwrecks: 14 July 1910
Ship	State	Description
D. F. Skinner	United States	The tug caught fire one mile (1.6 km) off Hart's Island and was beached there, and was destroyed.

=== 17 July ===
List of shipwrecks: 17 July 1910
Ship	State	Description
Beatrice	United States	The motor boat was sunk in a collision with Sadie (United States) in Canarsie Bay.
KSL Co. Barge No. 7	United States	While under tow from Cape Blossom to Kiwalik, District of Alaska, the 23-ton barge flooded, parted her hawser, and sank in Kotzebue Sound five nautical miles (9 km) south of Chamisso Island.

=== 19 July ===
List of shipwrecks: 19 July 1910
Ship	State	Description
Admiral Clark	United States	The barge struck a sunken log in the Delaware River near the Bordentown Bar and sank.
C. F. Roe	United States	The tow steamer burned off Sewaren, New Jersey.

=== 20 July ===
List of shipwrecks: 20 July 1910
Ship	State	Description
Dode	United States	Dode The steamboat struck a rock and sank off Marrowstone Island, Washington.

=== 21 July ===
List of shipwrecks: 21 July 1910
Ship	State	Description
Lucy	United Kingdom	The 89.9-foot (27.4 m), 159-ton coastal cargo ship sprung a leak and sank 45 miles (72 km) north northwest from the Bar Lightship. Her crew of 4 were rescued by the trawler Desideratum (United Kingdom) 14 miles (23 km) south southeast of Douglas Head the next day.
Trude R. Wiehe	United States	The steamer ran aground on Parker's Reef in heavy smoke. Burned the next day. Crew rescued by Field (United States).

=== 22 July ===
List of shipwrecks: 22 July 1910
Ship	State	Description
Mollie	United States	The tow steamer, laid up for repairs, burned in the Delaware River at Cramer Hill, New Jersey, from an exploding lamp.

=== 25 July ===
List of shipwrecks: 25 July 1910
Ship	State	Description
San Joaquin No. 3	United States	The steamer burned, probably in the San Francisco, California, area.

=== 26 July ===
List of shipwrecks: 26 July 1910
Ship	State	Description
Johnstown	United States	The laid up tow steamer sank at her dock at 10th Street, Hoboken, New Jersey.

=== 27 July ===
List of shipwrecks: 27 July 1910
Ship	State	Description
Arthur W. Palmer	United States	The tow steamer sank at her dock at Pacific Street, Brooklyn, New York.
USRC Commodore Perry	United States Revenue Cutter Service	The revenue cutter ran aground during dense fog off Tonki Point on St. Paul Island in the Pribilof Islands. All crew were rescued.
H. F. Bucs	United States	The tug sprang a leak in heavy weather on Lake Erie off Point Pelee and sank. Crew made it to shore in her yawl.

=== 28 July ===
List of shipwrecks: 28 July 1910
Ship	State	Description
William H. McCleve	United States	The barge foundered 5 miles (8.0 km) off Noves Point, Rhode Island.

=== 29 July ===
List of shipwrecks: 29 July 1910
Ship	State	Description
Helen Johnson	United States	The 39-ton, 58-foot (17.7 m) fishing vessel sank in the Chukchi Sea seven nautical miles (13 km) east of Point Hope, District of Alaska, after being ground to pieces over the course of five days by ice she was trapped in during a gale. The revenue cutter USRC Bear ( United States Revenue Cutter Service) rescued her crew of 10.

=== 30 July ===
List of shipwrecks: 30 July 1910
Ship	State	Description
Grace Whitney	United States	The barge was sunk in a collision with Ogdensburg (United States) three miles (5 km) east of Bar Point, Lake Erie. Wreck later blown up as a hazard to navigation. The captain's wife and son drowned trying to enter the lifeboat.
William Marvel	United States	The lighter was engaged in launching fireworks off the Manhattan Beach Hotel, New York that impaired visibility to the extent that she struck a rock and sank.

== August ==
=== 1 August ===
List of shipwrecks: 1 August 1910
Ship	State	Description
Albion	United States	The freighter was damaged in a collision with Chippewa (United States) in the Puget Sound two miles (3 km) off West Point, Washington. She was beached to prevent sinking.

=== 2 August ===
List of shipwrecks: 2 August 1910
Ship	State	Description
James Rolph	United States	The four-masted schooner ran aground in San Pablo Bay, near San Francisco. No lives lost and the ship was later stripped of salvageable components and abandoned.

=== 3 August ===
List of shipwrecks: 3 August 1910
Ship	State	Description
Sea Gannett	United States	The yacht burned 22 miles (35 km) off Barnegat, New Jersey. All aboard rescued by Joseph A. Fordney (United States).

=== 4 August ===
List of shipwrecks: 4 August 1910
Ship	State	Description
Newark	United States	The motor schooner was sunk in a collision with Crowley Launch No. 5 (United States) at Shelby's Wharf, California.

=== 5 August ===
List of shipwrecks: 5 August 1910
Ship	State	Description
Princess May	Canada	Princess May The passenger ship ran aground near the Sentinel Island Light, Alaska, United States. She later was refloated, repaired, and returned to service.

=== 9 August ===
List of shipwrecks: 9 August 1910
Ship	State	Description
USS Marcellus	United States Navy	The collier was rammed by the fruit steamer Rosario di Giorgio (Norway) about 60 nautical miles (110 km; 69 mi) off Cape Hatteras, North Carolina. She sank ten hours later with no loss of life. Deemed too expensive to salvage, Marcellus was struck from the Navy list on 22 September 1910.

=== 13 August ===
List of shipwrecks: 13 August 1910
Ship	State	Description
Martha Wilkes	United States	During a voyage from Anadyr on the Siberian coast of the Russian Empire to Nome, District of Alaska, with a crew of three and a cargo of 1,000 pounds (450 kg) of furs and hides on board, the 67-ton, 80-foot (24.4 m) schooner was wrecked in fog, high winds, and heavy seas on Cape Bering on the southwest coast of the Chukchi Peninsula in Siberia. Siberian natives rescued her crew on 14 August.

=== 14 August ===
List of shipwrecks: 14 August 1910
Ship	State	Description
Fidelio	United States	The yawl-rigged yacht sank in a collision with Vigilant (United States) off Point Judith, Rhode Island. All crew rescued by Vigilant.

=== 16 August ===
List of shipwrecks: 16 August 1910
Ship	State	Description
Sesnon #6	United States	While anchored off Nome, District of Alaska, with no cargo or crew aboard, the 16-ton barge broke loose from her moorings during a gale, was driven onto the beach four nautical miles (7 km) west of Nome, and was broken apart by waves.
Sesnon #7	United States	While anchored off Nome, District of Alaska, with no cargo or crew aboard, the 21-ton barge broke loose from her moorings during a gale and was pounded to pieces by waves against a wharf on the Nome waterfront.

=== 17 August ===
List of shipwrecks: 17 August 1910
Ship	State	Description
SMS S32	Imperial German Navy	The torpedo boat sank after colliding with the torpedo boat SMS S76 (Imperial German Navy) in the Baltic Sea.
SMS S76	Imperial German Navy	The torpedo boat sank after colliding with the torpedo boat SMS S32 (Imperial German Navy) in the Baltic Sea. She was raised, repaired, and returned to service.

=== 19 August ===
List of shipwrecks: 19 August 1910
Ship	State	Description
Walter Needham	United States	The steamer sank in 12 feet (3.7 m) of water at Metropolis, Illinois.

=== 20 August ===
List of shipwrecks: 20 August 1910
Ship	State	Description
Geraldine	United States	The steamer burned at the entrance to the Little Kanawha River at Petersburg, West Virginia.
Plymouth	United States	The steamer was holed by a log 4 1/2 miles (7 km) from Greensboro, Maryland, and sank. Later raised.

=== 21 August ===
List of shipwrecks: 21 August 1910
Ship	State	Description
HMS Bedford	Royal Navy	The Monmouth-class armoured cruiser was wrecked at Quelpart Island in the East China Sea with 18 men killed. The wreck was sold on 10 October for breaking up.
C. G. Witbeck	United States	The laid up ferry burned in the canal basin in Watervliet, New York.
Vivo	United Kingdom	The 129.9-foot (39.6 m), 270-ton steam trawler was wrecked in a thick fog bank in the North Channel and stranded 3.5 miles (5.6 km) northwest of the Mull of Galloway. The fishing steamer New Crown (United Kingdom) rescued her 11 crew, or they made it to shore in their boat. Declared a total loss in September and much equipment and machinery was salvaged. Wreck broke in two in October.

=== 24 August ===
List of shipwrecks: 24 August 1910
Ship	State	Description
Sun Ray	United States	The motor launch was sunk in Newark Bay in a collision with Majestic (United States) at the Lehigh Valley Railroad bridge. One crewman and one passenger killed.

=== 26 August ===
List of shipwrecks: 26 August 1910
Ship	State	Description
Brazoria	United States	The freighter was struck by a large swell crossing the bar into Absecon Inlet resulting in the ship flooding and losing steerage. The ship hit a breakwater and broke in two after being abandoned by the crew.
Pearly Mae	United States	The steamer burned in North West Creek, North Carolina.

=== 27 August ===
List of shipwrecks: 27 August 1910
Ship	State	Description
Geo. Chambers	United States	The canal boat was sunk in a collision on the Stone House Bar.

=== 28 August ===
List of shipwrecks: 28 August 1910
Ship	State	Description
Mars	United States	The steamer struck an obstruction in the Mississippi River near St. Paul, Minnesota, and sank in six feet (1.8 m) of water. She was raised and repaired.

=== 29 August ===
List of shipwrecks: 29 August 1910
Ship	State	Description
West Point	United Kingdom	The cargo steamship caught fire in the North Atlantic on 27 August, and her crew abandoned her in two lifeboats the next day. She sank on 29 August at position 42°20′N 44°10′W or 45°43′N 40°41′W (accounts differ). Devonian and RMS Mauretania rescued all of her crew.

=== 31 August ===
List of shipwrecks: 31 August 1910
Ship	State	Description
Louie	United States	The tug sprang a leak and sank at Baltimore, Maryland. Later raised.
Marie-Reine	Belgium	The ship caught fire at Thessalonika, Greece and sank.

== September ==
=== 1 September ===
List of shipwrecks: 1 September 1910
Ship	State	Description
Leif Erickson	United States	The fishing schooner was sunk in a collision with Chesapeake (United States) off the Fenwick Island Lightship. Three crewmen rescued by Chesapeake and eight by dories from the fishing schooner Edith M. Prior. Four crewmen lost.

=== 2 September ===
List of shipwrecks: 2 September 1910
Ship	State	Description
Breeze	United States	The passenger vessel sank in a collision with North America (United States) in the Providence River a one-quarter mile (0.4 km) off Fox Point Dock. Crew and 13 passengers rescued by North America.
Luella	United States	The 8-gross register ton motor vessel was driven ashore by a gale and ice and wrecked at North Head in Saint Lawrence Bay on the coast of Siberia.

=== 3 September ===
List of shipwrecks: 3 September 1910
Ship	State	Description
Pauline	United States	The steamer sprung a leak off Fort Diamond, New York, and was beached.

=== 4 September ===
List of shipwrecks: 4 September 1910
Ship	State	Description
Bristol	United States	The barge sank in a collision in thick fog with Dunneman (Italy) 18 miles (29 km) east northeast of Barnegat, New Jersey, in the Atlantic Ocean. Her master and one crewman killed.

=== 5 September ===
List of shipwrecks: 5 September 1910
Ship	State	Description
Pastime	United States	The tow steamer sank at Pennsylvania Lock No. 5 in the Monongahela River, possibly from too much coal aboard. Raised immediately.
William Cory	United Kingdom	William Cory aground at Pendeen The cargo steamship, carrying a cargo of timber from Uleåborg (Oulu), Finland to Newport, South Wales was wrecked at the foot of Boscaswell Cliff, near Pendeen Lighthouse.

=== 6 September ===
List of shipwrecks: 6 September 1910
Ship	State	Description
Robert White	United States	The laid up steamer sprung a leak and sank at the Atlantic Dock, Brooklyn, New York.

=== 7 September ===
List of shipwrecks: 7 September 1910
Ship	State	Description
Rosa	United Kingdom	The submarine HMS A11 (Royal Navy), departing from Portsmouth Harbour, England ran into the sailing barge, which sank. Its two-man crew was rescued.

=== 8 September ===
List of shipwrecks: 8 September 1910
Ship	State	Description
Kellogg	United States	The scow foundered at Milwaukee, Wisconsin, 12 nautical miles (22 km) north west of Little Point au Sable.

=== 9 September ===
List of shipwrecks: 9 September 1910
Ship	State	Description
Pere Marquette 18	United States	Pere Marquette 18, with Pere Marquette 17 assisting. The train ferry sank in Lake Michigan from unknown causes. Her Captain and 27 crewmen killed. 33 survivors rescued by Pere Marquette 17 (United States). During the rescue a lifeboat was smashed on the side of Pere Marquette No.17 by heavy seas killing two rescuers.
Protector	United States	The tug inadvertently flooded and sank when a seacock was accidentally left open at Charleston, South Carolina.

=== 10 September ===
List of shipwrecks: 10 September 1910
Ship	State	Description
M. P. Howlett	United States	The canal boat foundered in Woodbury Creek.

=== 11 September ===
List of shipwrecks: 11 September 1910
Ship	State	Description
Pilot	Canada	The tug was destroyed by fire somewhere in the Great Lakes.

=== 12 September ===
List of shipwrecks: 12 September 1910
Ship	State	Description
Joseph Peene Sr.	United States	The vessel was sunk by a broken sea valve at Yonkers, New York.

=== 16 September ===
List of shipwrecks: 16 September 1910
Ship	State	Description
Unknown scow	United States	A dump scow capsized and sank after being hit by a wake in Lake Erie off Buffalo, New York.

=== 18 September ===
List of shipwrecks: 18 September 1910
Ship	State	Description
Thomas Quayle	United States	The schooner was lost to fire at Cleveland, Ohio.

=== 19 September ===
List of shipwrecks: 19 September 1910
Ship	State	Description
Wildwood	United States	The steamer burned at Leschi Park in Lake Washington.

=== 20 September ===
List of shipwrecks: 20 September 1910
Ship	State	Description
KSL Co. Barge No. 4	United States	With no crew or cargo aboard, the 23-gross register ton barge parted her anchor line in strong winds and heavy seas and was stranded on the coast of the District of Alaska in Willow Bay (66°05′N 162°21′W) in Kotzebue Sound 12 nautical miles (22 km) northeast of Deering. Ice destroyed her during the winter of 1910–1911, ending her owner's hope of salvaging her in the spring of 1911.

=== 22 September ===
List of shipwrecks: 22 September 1910
Ship	State	Description
Dunbar	United States	The steamer sank in the Wolf River at Memphis, Tennessee. She was raised.
Duplin	United States	The inland passenger steamer sank at Sanderson's Mill, South Carolina, in the North East River, South Carolina.
Sallie Marmet	United States	The steamer sank in nine feet (2.7 m) of water in the Ohio River at Gallipolis Island after hitting an obstruction.

=== 23 September ===
List of shipwrecks: 23 September 1910
Ship	State	Description
Bethlehem	United States	The steamer ran aground in rain and fog on the west side of South Manitou Island, Michigan. Refloated on 4 October and taken to Manitowoc, Wisconsin.

=== 24 September ===
List of shipwrecks: 24 September 1910
Ship	State	Description
Brilliant	United States	The steamer sank at the Hunter's Point Bridge, Newtown Creek, when a water tank being filled overflowed and swamped the ship. Raised the next day.

=== 25 September ===
List of shipwrecks: 25 September 1910
Ship	State	Description
Rosamand	United States	The yacht burned at Moose Hollow, New York.

=== 26 September ===
List of shipwrecks: 26 September 1910
Ship	State	Description
Greenwood	United States	The steamer was holed by an obstruction and sank in 4 1/2 feet (1.4 m) of water at Riverton, Kentucky.

=== 27 September ===
List of shipwrecks: 27 September 1910
Ship	State	Description
The Leader	United States	The tow steamer burned in the Ohio River at Economy, Pennsylvania.

=== 28 September ===
List of shipwrecks: 28 September 1910
Ship	State	Description
Chester	United Kingdom	The passenger-cargo ship was badly damaged in a collision in the River Elbe with a Swedish steamer and was beached to prevent her from sinking. However, she sank quickly into the soft moving sand and became a total wreck, the water having flooded her holds.

=== 29 September ===
List of shipwrecks: 29 September 1910
Ship	State	Description
Catherine Davis	United States	The steamer sank in seven feet (2.1 m) of water at the foot of Ninth Street, Huntington, West Virginia, after hitting an obstruction.

=== Unknown date ===
List of shipwrecks: Unknown date September 1910
Ship	State	Description
Arctic	United States	The vessel was lost off Cape Douglas of the coast of the District of Alaska. The wreck report does not specify whether the incident occurred off Cape Douglas (58°51′N 153°15′W) on the northeast coast of the Alaska Peninsula or Cape Douglas (65°00′N 166°42′W) on the Bering Sea 51 nautical miles (94 km) northwest of Nome.
California	United States	The steamer was wrecked in Ward Cove off the western coast of Revillagigedo Island in the Alexander Archipelago in Southeast Alaska.
Luella	United States	The 115-gross register ton, 90-foot (27.4 m) sternwheel paddle steamer was lost on the Tanana River near Chena, District of Alaska.

== October ==
=== 1 October ===
List of shipwrecks: 1 October 1910
Ship	State	Description
L. L. Barth	United States	The steamer sprung a leak near Muskegon, Michigan. She put into harbor where she ran aground in 15 feet (4.6 m) of water.
New York	United States	The steamer foundered in Lake Huron 20 miles (32 km) off South Point, or Thunder Bay, Michigan, in Lake Huron. The crew was rescued by Mataafa and the barge Alex Holley (both United States).

=== 2 October ===
List of shipwrecks: 2 October 1910
Ship	State	Description
New York	United States	The laid up steamer burned at Berkley Dock.
Phenix	United States	The steamer sprang a leak and was beached at South Bay Point, Lake Ontario and was abandoned. Later refloated and towed to Ogdensburg, New York.

=== 4 October ===
List of shipwrecks: 4 October 1910
Ship	State	Description
Frank L. Vance	United States	The steamer burned on Lake Michigan off Ludington, Michigan.

=== 6 October ===
List of shipwrecks: 6 October 1910
Ship	State	Description
Muskegon	United States	The steamer burned at Michigan City, Indiana.

=== 7 October ===
List of shipwrecks: 7 October 1910
Ship	State	Description
Teller	United States	During a voyage in the District of Alaska from Teller to Mary's Igloo with two crewmen and a cargo of 30 tons of general merchandise, the 15-ton scow sprang a leak and sank in Grantley Harbor at the mouth of the Tuksuk River while at anchor and with no one aboard. She was a total loss.

=== 10 October ===
List of shipwrecks: 10 October 1910
Ship	State	Description
Diamond K	United States	The motor schooner sank off Cape Darby (64°19′N 162°47′W) near Nome, District of Alaska. The two people aboard survived.
Huntress	United States	With no one on board, the 9-gross register ton sternwheel motor paddle vessel foundered in the Ohio River at Evansville, Indiana.
Olympe	United Kingdom	Olympe The schooner was beached at Gunwalloe Church Cove, Cornwall.

=== 12 October ===
List of shipwrecks: 12 October 1910
Ship	State	Description
Emory Bailey	Canada	The schooner was wrecked unknown location in the Great Lakes.
W. W. Stewart	United States	The schooner burned at Buffalo, New York.

=== 14 October ===
List of shipwrecks: 14 October 1910
Ship	State	Description
Tacora	Norway	The Barkentine went ashore near Orient Point, New York. Refloated and returned to service.

=== 16 October ===
List of shipwrecks: 16 October 1910
Ship	State	Description
Crown Prince	United Kingdom	1910 Cuba hurricane: The cargo ship was wrecked 200 yards (180 m) offshore of Punta del Holendes, Cuba in a hurricane, a total loss. One crewman killed. The crew removed from beach on 24 October by the schooner Joven Quillen (Cuba) arriving at Havana, Cuba on 28 October.
Levi H. Pelton	United States	1910 Cuba hurricane: The towing steamer sank at Moser Channel, Florida, during a hurricane.

=== 17 October ===
List of shipwrecks: 17 October 1910
Ship	State	Description
Mistletoe	United States	1910 Cuba hurricane: The steamer capsized at Tampa, Florida, when a hurricane blew the water out of the bay. She flooded when the water returned. Raised before the end of the year.
Unknown schooner		1910 Cuba hurricane: A schooner burned and sank in the Gulf of Mexico during the hurricane 130 miles (210 km) north west of Cape Stanton. A few hours earlier Glanton (United Kingdom) sighted a lifeboat with six people in it, but it sank before they could be rescued.
Virginia	United States	1910 Cuba hurricane: The towing steamer broke up during a hurricane, location unknown.

=== 18 October ===
List of shipwrecks: 178 October 1910
Ship	State	Description
William C. Moreland	United States	The cargo ship was wrecked on Sawtooth Reef, Lake Superior off Eagle River. Her bow broke off and sank in deep water. Her stern section was salvaged, towed to Detroit, Michigan, and declared beyond repair and resunk off Port Huron, Michigan, in Lake Huron. The stern was raised again in 1916 and used to build Sir Trevor Dawson, and machinery salvaged.

=== 19 October ===
List of shipwrecks: 19 October 1910
Ship	State	Description
James and Agness	United Kingdom	The schooner was lost in the Bristol Channel off Lundy Island, Devon with the loss of all five crew.
Tacoma Maru	Japan	The cargo ship (6,178 GRT) ran aground off Fort Lawson Lighthouse when entering Seattle, Washington, in heavy fog. Refloated and returned to service.

=== 20 October ===
List of shipwrecks: 20 October 1910
Ship	State	Description
Vesta	United States	With no one on board, the 6-gross register ton motor vessel burned at Keokuk, Iowa.

=== 22 October ===
List of shipwrecks: 22 October 1910
Ship	State	Description
Lycoming	United States	The steamer struck a dock at Rondeau, Ontario, caught fire, burned to the waterline and sank, a total loss. Raised and beached in May 1911, probably scrapped. Crew rescued by another steamer.
Salem	United States	The laid up steamer foundered at Wilmington, Delaware. Raised the next day.

=== 23 October ===
List of shipwrecks: 23 October 1910
Ship	State	Description
Langham	United States	The steamer burned at anchor off Keeweenaw Point in Bete Grise Bay, Lake Superior.
R. J. Moran	United States	The tow steamer sank at the foot of Warren Street, Brooklyn, New York.

=== 26 October ===
List of shipwrecks: 26 October 1910
Ship	State	Description
Nevermind	United States	The 8-gross register ton, 41.4-foot (12.6 m) fishing schooner was driven ashore in a snowstorm and wrecked on Horse Island (58°15′15″N 134°43′30″W) in Lynn Canal near Douglas Island in Southeast Alaska. Her crew of two survived.

=== 27 October ===
List of shipwrecks: 27 October 1910
Ship	State	Description
Canal Boat No.241	United States	The canal boat foundered in Frankford Creek.

=== 28 October ===
List of shipwrecks: 28 October 1910
Ship	State	Description
Eugene H. Cathrall	United States	The schooner was sunk in a collision with Scow No. 57 in the Delaware River between League Island and Sanitarium Wharf. Subsequently raised.

=== 29 October ===
List of shipwrecks: 29 October 1910
Ship	State	Description
Unknown canal boat	United States	A canal boat was sunk in a collision with North Land (United States) in the area of New York City.

=== 31 October ===
List of shipwrecks: 31 October 1910
Ship	State	Description
Paca Nova	Unknown	The cattle lighter, converted from the paddle steamer Brodick Castle, sank in a gale off Portland Bill at 50°30′N 02°20′W after the tow rope broke; she was on a voyage from Hellevoetsluis to Argentina or Brazil in tow of the tug Maria Hendrika III (Netherlands). The riding crew of two were saved by the tug.
Raritan	United States	The freighter sank in the No. 4 Lock of the Delaware and Raritan Canal.
Wasp	United States	The steamer burned at Gulfport, Mississippi.

=== Unknown date ===
List of shipwrecks: Unknown date October 1910
Ship	State	Description
Arkadia	United States	1910 Cuba hurricane: The cargo steamship departed New Orleans, Louisiana on 11 October for San Juan, Puerto Rico, and was never heard from again. Probably lost in a hurricane on 14 October. Lost with all 33 crew and 4 passengers. One of her lifeboats was found on the coast of Pinar Del Rio Provence, Cuba.
Céspedes	Cuba	1910 Cuba hurricane: The gunboat was sunk in the hurricane near Arroyos de Mantua, Pinar del Río, Cuba around 16 October. The captain, engineer, and some crewmen died.
H. D. Tupper	United States	The 116-gross register ton canal boat was lost in a collision with an unidentified vessel on the Saint Lawrence River off Chambly, Quebec. The only person on board survived.
Silverdale	United Kingdom	1910 Cuba hurricane: The cargo steamship departed New York City on 7 October for Havana, Cuba and was never heard from again. Possibly lost in a hurricane in the area of Cuba on 14 October. Lost with all 24 crew.

== November ==
=== 1 November ===
List of shipwrecks: 1 November 1910
Ship	State	Description
Winona	United States	The steamer was found to be leaking badly just after leaving Pontoosac, Illinois. She was beached, but sank in the Mississippi River in five feet (1.5 m) of water. Raised and repaired.

=== 2 November ===
List of shipwrecks: 2 November 1910
Ship	State	Description
America	United States	The tow steamer burned in the Delaware River off Centerton, New Jersey.

=== 3 November ===
List of shipwrecks: 3 November 1910
Ship	State	Description
Eclipse	United States	The steamer burned in the Merremic River at Morschels, Missouri.
F. Bontecou	United States	The barge was sunk in a collision with M. Martin (United States) at Parrs Island, New York.
John H. Jeffery Jr.	United States	The steamer burned at Duluth, Minnesota.
Lycoming	United States	The steamer burned in Rondeau Harbour, Canada.

=== 4 November ===
List of shipwrecks: 4 November 1910
Ship	State	Description
Capitol City	United States	The dredge sank in the channel into Black Rock Harbor, Connecticut, in a gale. The vessel was raised by end of the year.
John A. Patten	United States	The laid up steamer burned at Bridgeport, Alabama.
Louise	United States	The wreck of the 8-gross register ton, 34-foot (10.4 m) motor cargo vessel, crushed by ice, was found on the coast of the District of Alaska 1 nautical mile (1.9 km) northeast of Cape Prince of Wales. She had departed Anadyr, Siberia, on 1 November bound for Nome, District of Alaska. The bodies of the four men who had been on board – two crewmen and two passengers – were never found.
Mabel	United States	The steamer swamped and sank in a dry dock in a heavy storm at Perth Amboy. Later raised.

=== 5 November ===
List of shipwrecks: 5 November 1910
Ship	State	Description
Veta	United States	The steamer was wrecked on a reef off Yeo Island, Georgian Bay, Lake Ontario, Canada.

=== 6 November ===
List of shipwrecks: 6 November 1910
Ship	State	Description
Pastime	United States	The tow steamer burned at Little Falls, West Virginia, on the Monongahela River.
Preussen	Germany	Preussen The five-masted ship-rigged windjammer was accidentally rammed by Brighton (United Kingdom) in the English Channel off Dover, England, and beached without loss of life.
Wasaga	Canada	The steamer caught fire, burned to the waterline and sank in 35 feet of water at Copper Harbor, Michigan, Keweenaw Point, in Lake Superior. Crew rescued by Westmount (Canada).

=== 8 November ===
List of shipwrecks: 8 November 1910
Ship	State	Description
Wimborne	United Kingdom	The steamer was wrecked under Carn Barra Point near Land's End, Cornwall, United Kingdom. The crew were rescued by rocket lines from the shore.

=== 10 November ===
List of shipwrecks: 10 November 1910
Ship	State	Description
Baroness	United States	The barge sank in a collision with an unknown sail vessel ten miles (16 km) west southwest of the Fire Island Lightship in the Atlantic Ocean. Her crew was rescued by the sailing vessel and landed in Europe.

=== 12 November ===
List of shipwrecks: 12 November 1910
Ship	State	Description
Portland	United States	During a voyage from Juneau to Cordova, District of Alaska, carrying 30 passengers, a crew of 53, and a cargo of 300 tons of general merchandise, the 1,420-gross register ton, 191.8-foot (58.5 m) steamer struck a submerged rock off Palm Point (60°11′N 144°33′W) in Katalla Bay (60.1819°N 144.4972°W) on the coast of Southcentral Alaska, floated off, and was beached on the shore of the bay, where she began to break up in the surf 12 hours later, becoming a total loss. All on board survived.

=== 13 November ===
List of shipwrecks: 13 November 1910
Ship	State	Description
Royal	United States	The steamer was holed by a log near the Blue River Bar in the Ohio River 5 miles (8 km) below New Amsterdam, Indiana. She sank in shallow water on the Kentucky side of the river. Raised and repaired.
Sadie Lee	United States	The steamer was holed by a log at O.K. Landing on the Mississippi River and sank. She was raised.
Sea Light	United States	The 20-gross register ton, 42.7-foot (13.0 m) motor vessel was stranded in Larch Bay (56°12′N 134°43′W) 4 nautical miles (7 km) north of Cape Ommaney in Southeast Alaska. Her entire crew of eight survived. She later was salvaged and returned to service.

=== 16 November ===
List of shipwrecks: 16 November 1910
Ship	State	Description
Infernet	none	The former French cruiser, in tow of the tug Hercules (Germany) from Rochefort to Stettin for demolition, broke from its tow and was stranded near Sables-d'Olonne; later broken up in situ.

=== 17 November ===
List of shipwrecks: 17 November 1910
Ship	State	Description
James B. Eades	United States	The steamer sank in a storm off the Presque Isle Peninsula near Erie, Pennsylvania, in Lake Erie.

=== 18 November ===
List of shipwrecks: 18 November 1910
Ship	State	Description
Edith	United States	The canal boat collided with cribbing of the Baltimore and Ohio Railroad bridge over the Schuylkill River and sank.
Sea Prince	United States	The steamer was sunk in a collision in San Francisco Bay with Grey Stoke Castle (United Kingdom). Four crewmen killed.

=== 21 November ===
List of shipwrecks: 21 November 1910
Ship	State	Description
May	United States	The launch was sunk at a dock in East San Pedro, California, when Watson (United States) drifted into her.
Panther	United States	The steamer sank near Garden Island, Lake Michigan in shallow water. Raised in 1911, repaired and lengthened, returned to service.

=== 22 November ===
List of shipwrecks: 22 November 1910
Ship	State	Description
Selja	Norway	The steamer was sunk in a collision three miles (5 km) off Point Reyes, California, with Beaver (United States). Two crewmen killed.

=== 23 November ===
List of shipwrecks: 23 November 1910
Ship	State	Description
B. B.	United States	The steamer sank after someone broke in to the laid up vessel and opened a valve at Moline, Illinois. Vessel was raised.
Gem	United States	The steamer struck an obstruction in the Mississippi River and sank at a wharf at New Orleans, Louisiana. Raised, repaired, and returned to service.
Henry C. Cadmus	United States	The barge went ashore on Duck Island off Clinton, Connecticut.
Typhoon	United States	The barge went ashore on Duck Island off Clinton, Connecticut.

=== 24 November ===
List of shipwrecks: 24 November 1910
Ship	State	Description
Oneida	United States	The tugboat ran aground in the Niagara River. She burned over night.

=== 26 November ===
List of shipwrecks: 26 November 1910
Ship	State	Description
Saucy Jim	Canada	The tug burned at dock at Christian Island, north west of Midland, Ontario, in Georgian Bay.

=== 27 November ===
List of shipwrecks: 27 November 1910
Ship	State	Description
Mary	United States	The fishing tug sprung a leak and sank 15 miles (24 km) off Chicago, Illinois. Her crew of four made it to shore in her lifeboat.

=== 30 November ===
List of shipwrecks: 30 November 1910
Ship	State	Description
Cantonia	United States	The steamer burned at Canton, Missouri.
General	United States	The tug was cut in two and sunk in a collision in a blinding snowstorm near Lime Island in the St. Marys River with Athabasca (Canada). Three crewmen killed.
Hattie Darling	United States	The steamer was damaged by ice and sank entering the Kahkle Bros. Boat Yard on the Mississippi River at Rock Island, Illinois. Vessel was raised and repaired.
Pittsburg	United States	The dredge steamer burned opposite Economy, Pennsylvania, on the Ohio River.

== December ==
=== 3 December ===
List of shipwrecks: 3 December 1910
Ship	State	Description
Marie Thomas	United States	The freighter burned and sank in the Murderkill River at Milton, Delaware.

=== 5 December ===
List of shipwrecks: 5 December 1910
Ship	State	Description
Stirling Castle	United Kingdom	The cargo steamer, which also used the name Nord America, ran aground off Morocco. She was refloated and towed to Genoa, Italy, where she was laid up before being scrapped in 1911.
Unknown barge	United States	A barge became waterlogged and sank in the Swash Channel entering New York Harbor and sank.

=== 7 December ===
List of shipwrecks: 7 December 1910
Ship	State	Description
Geo. Nelson	United States	The steamer was holed by ice and sank in Lake St. Clair in 24 feet (7.3 m) of water. Her crew of 7 made it to shore on the 9th.

=== 8 December ===
List of shipwrecks: 8 December 1910
Ship	State	Description
John S. Parsons	United States	The barge was wrecked on Rock Shoal in the St. Lawrence River.
Stella O'Callaghan	United States	The barge fouled another barge and sank one mile (1.6 km) south southeast of New Haven Light. Later raised.

=== 9 December ===
List of shipwrecks: 9 December 1910
Ship	State	Description
Annie C. Grace	United States	The 516-gross register ton schooner departed Port Royal, South Carolina, bound for Baltimore, Maryland, with seven people on board and was never heard from again.
Axim	United Kingdom	The Elder Dempster 2,804 GRT cargo ship left London on 9 December, bound for the Canary Islands but did not arrive. There were reports from another British ship that left Liverpool around the same time of violent storms, so it was presumed that she foundered and sank.
Ethel J.	United States	The steamer hull was damaged by ice while leaving the harbor of Grand Marais, Michigan, on Lake Superior. She sank after returning to the dock. Raised, repaired and returned to service.

=== 10 December ===
List of shipwrecks: 10 December 1910
Ship	State	Description
HMS Elfin	Royal Navy	While transporting Royal Navy sailors to the depot ship HMS Thames (Royal Navy), the tender collided with the submarine HMS C8 (Royal Navy) in the harbor at Harwich, England, and sank with the loss of five lives. She was refloated, repaired, and returned to service.
Jean	Canada	The tug burned to the waterline at Amherstburg, Ontario.
Olympia	United States	The wreck of Olympia During a voyage from Cordova to Valdez, District of Alaska, carrying 56 passengers, 60 crewmen, and a cargo of 350 tons of coal and general merchandise, the 2,827-gross register ton, 335-foot (102.1 m) steamship was wrecked without loss of life on Bligh Reef northwest of Bligh Island in Prince William Sound on the coast of Southcentral Alaska during a gale. Tugs from Valdez and Fort Liscum rescued her passengers and crew. Following the wreck, Steamboat Inspection Service investigators accused her captain of "unskillful navigation." Her wreck remained upright and visible on the reef until February 1922.

=== 12 December ===
List of shipwrecks: 12 December 1910
Ship	State	Description
Braddock	United States	The tow steamer rolled on its side and sank at No. 6 Lock, Rice's Landing, Pennsylvania, on the Monongahela River after hitting an obstruction. Raised, repaired and returned to service.

=== 13 December ===
List of shipwrecks: 13 December 1910
Ship	State	Description
Stella O'Callahan	United States	The Barge was rammed and sunk by a scow at New Haven, Connecticut.

=== 14 December ===
List of shipwrecks: 14 December 1910
Ship	State	Description
Columbia	United States	The motor launch was sunk in a collision with Kitsap (United States) in heavy fog in the area of Seattle harbor. One crewman killed, one rescued by Kitsap.
Kitsap	United States	The steamer was sunk in a collision with Indianapolis (United States) in heavy fog in Seattle harbor. Everyone on board rescued by Indianapolis.
Loretta	United States	The delivery steamer was sunk by ice in the commercial slip in the harbor at Buffalo, New York.
Ottawa	United States	The steamer burned at Cape Vincent, New York, due to spontaneous combustion of her cargo of coal.

=== 16 December ===
List of shipwrecks: 16 December 1910
Ship	State	Description
Abbie G. Cole	United States	The schooner was wrecked on Stone Horse Shoal and broke up. Her crew was rescued by USRC Gresham ( United States Revenue Cutter Service).
Hannah Beatrice	United Kingdom	The ketch, sailed from Ballinacurra, County Cork, for Dublin with malt, on 15 December and not seen again. She was believed lost in a hurricane off the Irish coast on the following day.
Jesse	United Kingdom	The schooner, sailed from Ballinacurra, County Cork, for Dublin with barley, on 15 December and not seen again. She was believed lost in a hurricane off the Irish coast on the following day.
Lucy Johns	United Kingdom	The schooner, sailed from Ballinacurra, County Cork, for Southampton with oats, on 15 December and not seen again. She was believed lost in a hurricane off the Irish coast on the following day.
S. A. Fownes	Canada	The schooner, dismasted in a gale, was blown over Pollock Rip Shoal eventually sinking five or six miles (8 or 10 km) south east of Monomoy Island. Just before sinking her crew was rescued by USRC Gresham ( United States Revenue Cutter Service). Nine members of Gresham's crew later received the United States Life Saving Service's Life Saving Medal for the rescue.
Sappho	United Kingdom	The ketch sailed from Waterford, Ireland, for St. Helier, Jersey with malt, on 15 December and not seen again. She was believed lost in a hurricane off the Irish coast on the following day.
Stanley Miner	United States	The tow steamer sank off Pier 45 in the North River from unknown causes. raised before end of year and repaired.
Victoria	United Kingdom	The schooner sailed from Ballinacurra, County Cork, for Dublin, with oats, on 15 December and not seen again. She was believed lost in a hurricane off the Irish coast on the following day.

=== 17 December ===
List of shipwrecks: 17 December 1910
Ship	State	Description
Genesee	United States	The canal boat struck a submerged wreck a short distance west of North Brother's Light and sank.
Leland	United States	The steamer burned at Huron, Ontario.

=== 20 December ===
List of shipwrecks: 20 December 1910
Ship	State	Description
Clara E. Uhler	United States	The steamer sank at the City Coal Dock at New Bedford, Massachusetts. Raised on 24 December.

=== 21 December ===
List of shipwrecks: 21 December 1910
Ship	State	Description
Russia	Belgium	Her cargo of Esparto grass caught fire and she was abandoned 100 nautical miles (190 km) southwest of Ouessant, France. All forty-one crew rescued by Hampshire (United Kingdom).

=== 22 December ===
List of shipwrecks: 22 December 1910
Ship	State	Description
Warnick	United States	The tugboat struck a rock in the Niagara River and was beached. She burned over night.

=== 24 December ===
List of shipwrecks: 24 December 1910
Ship	State	Description
Alaska	Canada	The steamer was destroyed by fire at Tobomorry, Ontario, Canada.

=== 25 December ===
List of shipwrecks: 25 December 1910
Ship	State	Description
Baltique	Belgium	The steamship was accidentally rammed and sunk by Finland (Belgium) in the Flushing Roads (51°25′30″N 3°35′22″E) with the loss of six of her sixteen crew.

=== 28 December ===
List of shipwrecks: 28 December 1910
Ship	State	Description
Leonard Richards	United States	The tow steamer sprung a leak and sank at the Atlantic Dock, Brooklyn, New York.

=== 31 December ===
List of shipwrecks: 31 December 1910
Ship	State	Description
Elsie	United States	With no one aboard, the 159-gross register ton steamer sank during a snowstorm while at anchor in Valdez Bay (61°07′N 146°16′W) off Valdez on the south-central coast of the District of Alaska.
Sheldon Bros.	United States	The steamer struck heavy ice and sank near Erie, Pennsylvania.

== Unknown date ==
List of shipwrecks: Unknown date 1910
Ship	State	Description
Charles L. Hutchinson	United States	The 80-ton barge sank in the Yukon River at Kaltag, District of Alaska.
Crown	Norway	The barque was abandoned in the Atlantic Ocean (28°39′N 44°39′W). Crew rescued by Kilsyrh (United Kingdom). Reported still afloat off the east coast of the U.S. in the summer of 1910.
Febrero	Flag unknown	The ore carrying ship hit an unnamed rock to the northeast of the Runnel Stone, near Land's End, Cornwall, England. All crew were lost except for the cook.
Heart Failure	United States	Heart Failure in 2019. The wooden barge was abandoned sometime before 1910. Her wreck lies in 18 feet (5.5 m) of water in Lake Huron off the coast of Michigan at 45.0621°N 83.37755°W.
Loch Katrine	United Kingdom	The ship was dismasted and abandoned. She was later towed to Sydney and hulked.
Lothair	Peru	The composite clipper was lost.
Minnie	United States	The schooner sank in the Great Lakes sometime in 1910.
Princess	United States	The steamer was wrecked in Ward Cove off the western coast of Revillagigedo Island in the Alexander Archipelago in Southeast Alaska.
Sea Wolf	United States	The motor schooner sank one nautical mile (2 km) off Nome, District of Alaska, late in the autumn of 1910.
Sesnon #8	United States	The barge was reported lost at Nome, District of Alaska.
USAT Sheridan	United States Army	The transport was wrecked off Barnegat Light.
Stad Schleswig	Germany	The cargo vessel was lost at sea sometime in 1910.
Winneconne	United States	The tug was sunk at Milwaukee, Wisconsin, some time in 1910.
