= George Pirie Thomson =

Royal Navy officer (1887–1965)

Rear-Admiral George Pirie Thomson
- Born: 30 January 1887; Jubbulpore, India
- Died: 24 January 1965 (aged 77); Roehampton, London, England
- Military career
- Allegiance: United Kingdom of Great Britain and Ireland
- Branch: Royal Navy
- Rank: Rear Admiral
- Commands: Submarines HMS A11, HMS C24, HMS K6; Sixth Submarine Flotilla; cruiser HMS Devonshire
- Awards: Africa General Service Medal (1902–04), the Somaliland clasp, OBE, CBE

External image
- George Pirie Thomson

George Pirie Thomson (30 January 1887 – 24 January 1965) was a British Royal Navy officer. He is most well known for his work as Britain's Chief Press Censor during the Second World War.

== Early years ==
Thomson was born on 30 January 1887 at Jabalpur in India. His parents were Robert Brown Thomson, a civil engineer in the public works department, and May Forbes, daughter of William R. Pirie. His parents took Thomson to Switzerland and he spoke only French until he was six years old. He was later sent to George Watson's College in Edinburgh.

== Royal Navy ==
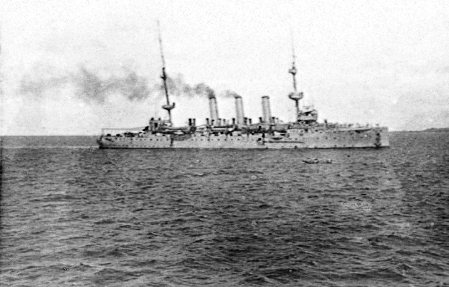
HMS Hyacinth circa. 1915

Thomson joined the Royal Navy at the age of fifteen. He claimed that he chose the Royal Navy because he thought that the naval uniform might make him look slimmer.

In 1903 he was rated midshipman and appointed to the cruiser HMS Hyacinth which was then the flagship of rear-admiral George Atkinson-Willes. Hyacinth was part of a squadron of three ships, the others being HMS Fox and HMS Mohawk, which took part in the Fourth Expedition of the Somaliland Campaign. On 20 April Hyacinth and Fox arrived off the Gulluli River after dark. The next day a landing party went ashore: one hundred and twenty-five men of the Hampshire Regiment accompanied more than 300 sailors, commanded by Captain Horace Hood. The fort, which was defended "by rifle fire and mixed iron missiles from two old cannon", was captured with a loss of three killed and twelve wounded.

In 1908 Thomson passed for lieutenant. In 1910 he was given command of submarine HMS A11 and a year later he transferred to HMS C24 which was then one of the newest vessels. At the beginning of the First World War he was serving on the battleship HMS St. Vincent of the Grand Fleet as a watch-keeper and German interpreter. In 1915 he was given the command of a submarine and spent the last three years of the war in submarine service. Although he did not sink any enemy vessels while on patrol, he was appointed an OBE for his good work.

After the war, Thomson continued in submarines and in 1920 he was promoted to commander. Also, by this time, he had qualified as an interpreter in four languages, was selected for the Staff Course and was then appointed to the Admiralty for the Naval Intelligence Division.

In 1923 Thomson was given the command of HMS K6, the latest British submarine, which was then the largest in the world.

Thomson was appointed to the flagship HMS Revenge as staff-officer (operations) and in 1927 he was promoted to captain while in command of the Sixth Submarine Flotilla at Portland. He remained almost continuously in command of submarine flotillas for the next six years. Later he became Chief of Staff in China and from December 1935 to November 1936 he commanded the cruiser HMS Devonshire.

From 1937 to January 1939 he was second member of the Naval Board of Australia. Then, having served in the navy for thirty-five years, he was promoted to the rank of rear-admiral and retired from the navy.

Thomson married Hilda Long in 1909 and had two daughters.

== Press Censor ==
In 1938, in anticipation of war, a system for press censorship was set up, but not implemented, as an arm of the Ministry of Information. The censor's office was initially staffed by retired officers from the Royal Navy, Royal Air Force and the Army and was under the command of Admiral Usborne. World War II started when German forces invaded Poland on 1 September 1939. As events unfolded the censor's office was inundated with requests and when, two days later, the liner SS Athenia was sunk the system was pushed to breaking point. Usborne insisted to Winston Churchill, who had just been appointed as the First Lord of the Admiralty, that he must have a deputy.

Thomson had been on holiday in the south of France when the war started. Thomson returned to London and presented himself to Churchill. Churchill ordered him to: "Go at once to the Ministry of Information and give Admiral Usborne a hand with the Press Censorship. He appears to be hard pressed." Thomson later recalled in his book, Blue Pencil Admiral, that he had had "an experience of the Press which was limited to reading my newspaper at the breakfast table". Despite this inexperience, Thomson found himself dealing with Press Censorship less than a fortnight after the start of the war.

There were no special laws about what the press could publish; journalists were under the same obligation as any other citizen not to engage in "obtaining, recording, communicating to any other person or publishing information which might be useful to an enemy". (Note: Defence regulation No 3 quoted by Thomson.) The British press censorship system was voluntary and there was no requirement to submit articles before publication; however, those articles that were submitted and cleared for publication effectively protected the newspaper from legal consequences. A series of D (for defence) notices warned which topics were to be avoided and items were not to be submitted to the censor unless there was some doubt as to whether they conflicted with these D notices. After the war, Thomson wrote: "there were over 400,000 separate issues of newspapers during the war ... [from which] only 650,000 news items were submitted [to censorship] – that is, only one and a half items from each separate newspaper".

The body of censors, being retired officers, were used to giving orders and the journalists were used to challenging authority. However, Thomson made it clear to journalists that he was on their side and a mutually trusting relationship developed. Thomson would not tolerate censorship that ran counter to common sense even when this breached the letter of the D notices and he was always ready to explain why a particular decision had been made.

Admiral Usborne remained at the ministry of information until January 1940. In December 1940 Thomson became chief press censor, a post he held until the end of the war.

== Later life ==
After the war, it was decided that the system which Thomson had been operating should be continued in peacetime under the title of the Services, Press, and Broadcasting Committee, with Thomson as secretary. He remained in this post until the early 60s. He was also appointed public relations officer of the Latin American Centre.

Thomson was appointed OBE in 1919, CBE in 1939, and CB in 1946; he was knighted in the New Year's Honours of 1963. He died at Queen Mary's Hospital, Roehampton, on 24 January 1965.

Material relating to Thomson is stored in Liddell Hart Centre for Military Archives of King's College London.

== Bibliography ==
Newspapers

- "Promotion to Flag Rank – Half-Yearly List". The Times. 10 January 1939. p. 6.
- "NAVAL BOARD CHANGE – Captain G. P. Thomson. – DISTINGUISHED CAREER OF NEW SECOND MEMBER". The Sydney Morning Herald. 2 January 1937. p. 12.
- "Sir George Thomson (Obituary)". The Times. 26 January 1965. p. 14 column c.
- Arthur, Elton (30 January 1965). "Sir George Thomson (Letter)". The Times. p. 10 column e.

Other sources

- "History of the D-Notice System". Defence Advisory (DA) Notice system. Defence, Press and Broadcasting Advisory Committee. Archived from the original on 9 June 2013.
- "THOMSON, Rear-Adm. Sir George (Pirie)". Who Was Who.
- Thomson, G.P. (1947). Blue Pencil Admiral – Secrets of the Press Censorship by the Chief Censor. Sampson Low, Marston & co.
- Woodward, David R. "Thomson, Sir George Pirie (1887–1965)". Oxford Dictionary of National Biography (online ed.). Oxford University Press. doi:10.1093/ref:odnb/36501. (Subscription, Wikipedia Library access or UK public library membership required.)
