= SMS S32 =

List of ships with the same or similar names

Two ships of the German Imperial Navy were named SMS S32. They were both torpedo boats built by Schichau-Werke.

- SMS S32 (1886) - torpedo boat launched by Schichau on 12 November 1886. Sunk in collision with the torpedo boat S76 on 17 August 1910.
- SMS S32 (1914) - "large"- or "high-seas"-torpedo boat, launched by Schichau on 28 February 1914. Scuttled at Scapa Flow on 21 June 1919.
