= SS Olympia =

Ocean liner (1883–1910)

Coordinates: 60°50′26″N 146°52′48″W

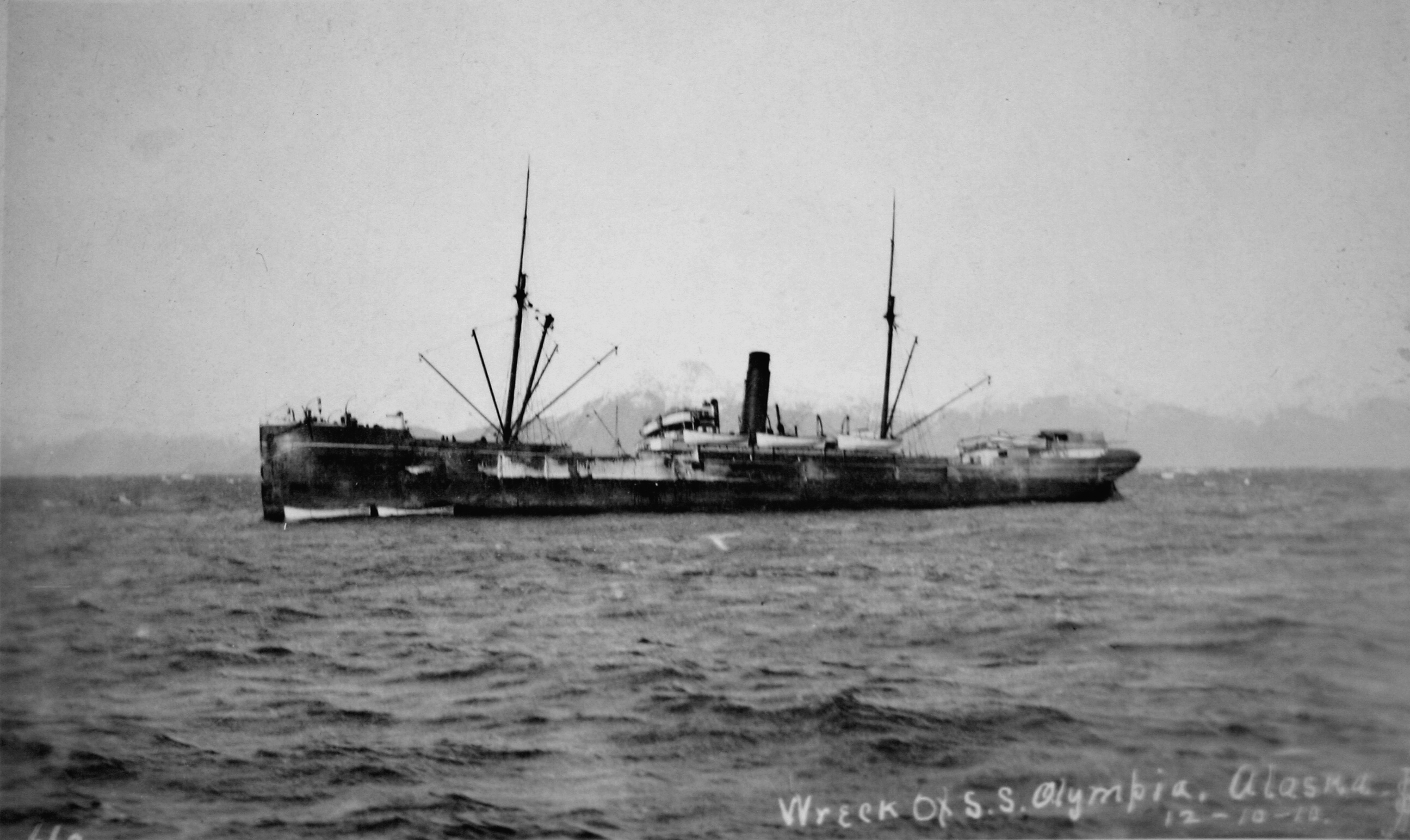
- SS Olympia seen aground on Bligh Reef, 10 December 1910

History

- Name: SS Dunbar Castle (1883-1895); SS Olympia (1895-1910)
- Operator: Castle Mail Packet Company (1883-1895); Fairfield Shipbuilding and Engineering Company (1895-1897); Scottish American Steam Ship Co. (1897); Northern Pacific Steamship Line (1897-1898); North America Mail Steam Ship Co. (1898-1903); North Western Steam Ship Co. (1903-1904); Alaska Steam Ship Co. (1904-1910)
- Builder: Barclay, Curle and Co., Glasgow, Scotland
- Launched: 2 August 1883
- Completed: 1883
- Fate: Wrecked 10 December 1910

General characteristics
- Tonnage: 2,837 (gross)
- Length: 335 ft (102 m)
- Beam: 38 ft (12 m)

SS Olympia was a steamship that served the northwest United States and Alaska during the Klondike Gold Rush. She was wrecked in 1910.

Olympia was laid down as SS Doune Castle but launched as SS Dunbar Castle in 1883 by Barclay, Curle and Co. of Glasgow, Scotland, for the Castle Mail Packet Company. In 1895, Dunbar Castle was sold to Fairfield Ship Building and Engineering Co. and renamed SS Olympia.

In 1897, the Scottish American Steamship Company bought her, and later that year she was bought by the Northern Pacific Steamship Line. In 1898, she operated with the North America Mail Steamship Company of Tacoma, Washington. In 1903, she operated under the North Western Steam Ship Company of Seattle, Washington, which sold her to the Alaska Steam Ship Company in 1904. That year, lifeboats were installed.

On 10 December 1910, Olympia ran aground on Bligh Reef off Alaska's Prince William Sound and sank without loss of life. Following the sinking, steamboat inspectors accused Captain Daniels, in command of Olympia when she ran aground, of "unskillful navigation."

== Notes ==
- "Details of the Wreck of the S.S. Olympia", Fairbanks Daily News-Miner. 3 January 1911. Page 2.
