= Bligh Island (Alaska) =

Island in Prince William Sound, Alaska

Coordinates: 60°49′51″N 146°45′46″W

Bligh Island is an island located in Prince William Sound, Alaska. This island – or more precisely, the neighboring Bligh Reef – was the location of the 1989 Exxon Valdez oil spill.

The island was named after William Bligh, of future HMS Bounty fame, who served as Master aboard ship during James Cook's third world voyage.
