= James Rolph (ship) =

American schooner built 1899

Coordinates: 37.5834°N 122.5176°W

- James Rolph

History

United States
- Name: James Rolph
- Namesake: James Rolph
- Owner: Rolph Navigation Co.
- Port of registry: San Francisco
- Builder: Hans Ditlev Bendixsen, Fairhaven, California
- Launched: 1899
- Fate: Wrecked, 1910

General characteristics
- Type: Schooner
- Tonnage: 586 GRT; 517 NRT
- Length: 169 ft 2 in (51.56 m)
- Beam: 37 ft 11 in (11.56 m)
- Depth of hold: 12 ft 8 in (3.86 m)
- Sail plan: Schooner

The James Rolph was a schooner that transported cargo around the United States West Coast and Hawaii. Built near Eureka, California in 1899, the ship was based in San Francisco and owned by its namesake, shipping executive and future Governor of California, James Rolph.

On the evening of August 2, 1910, the Rolph embarked from San Francisco with a cargo of general freight, lime, hay, and 14,000 board feet (33 m^{3}) of lumber for sugar plantations in Hana, Hawaii on the island of Maui when the ship was swept by currents in San Francisco Bay in heavy fog. At 10 in the evening, the ship, blinded by the fog, sailed close to the shore, crashing into rocks at Point San Pedro in Pacifica, grounding 50 feet from the shoreline. The Rolph was grounded at the same spot where the four-masted bark Drumburton had been lost previously in 1904. The Rolph's crew managed to reach shore safely without any injuries or loss of life, yet the vessel could not be pulled off the rocks. Tugboats attempted to haul the Rolph free but to no avail.

The Rolph was later stripped of usable fittings by salvage crews and abandoned.
