= Bligh Reef =

Reef in Prince William Sound, Alaska

Coordinates: 60°50′26″N 146°52′48″W

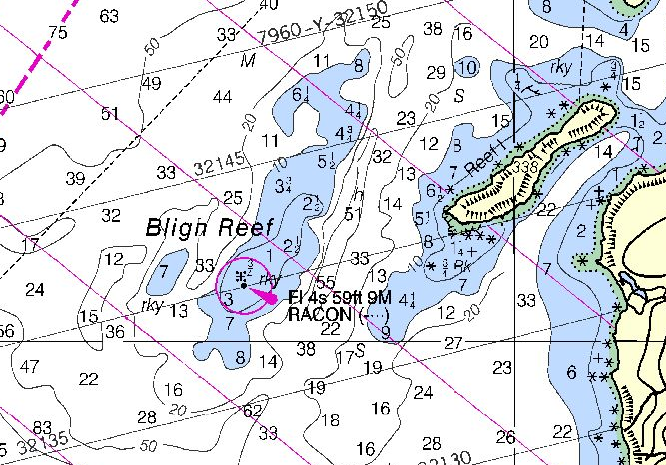
Map excerpt showing Bligh Reef and automated beacon.

Bligh Reef, sometimes known as Bligh Island Reef, is a reef off the coast of Bligh Island in Prince William Sound, Alaska. This was the location of the 1989 Exxon Valdez oil spill. After the incident, 33 US Code § 2733 mandated the operation of an automated navigation light to prevent future collisions with the reef. Despite these efforts the tug Pathfinder ran aground on Bligh Reef on Dec 24, 2009, rupturing its tanks and spilling diesel fuel. Bligh Reef is also where Alaska Steamship Company's Olympia ran aground in 1910.

Bligh Reef serves as a fishing ground for halibut and a harvesting area for shrimp. The nearest town is Tatitlek, which lies seven miles (eleven kilometers) to the northeast.

The reef was named after William Bligh, of future HMS Bounty fame, who served as Master aboard ship during James Cook's third world voyage.
