= The New Yorker (fireboat) =

Retired New York City fireboat (1890–1931)

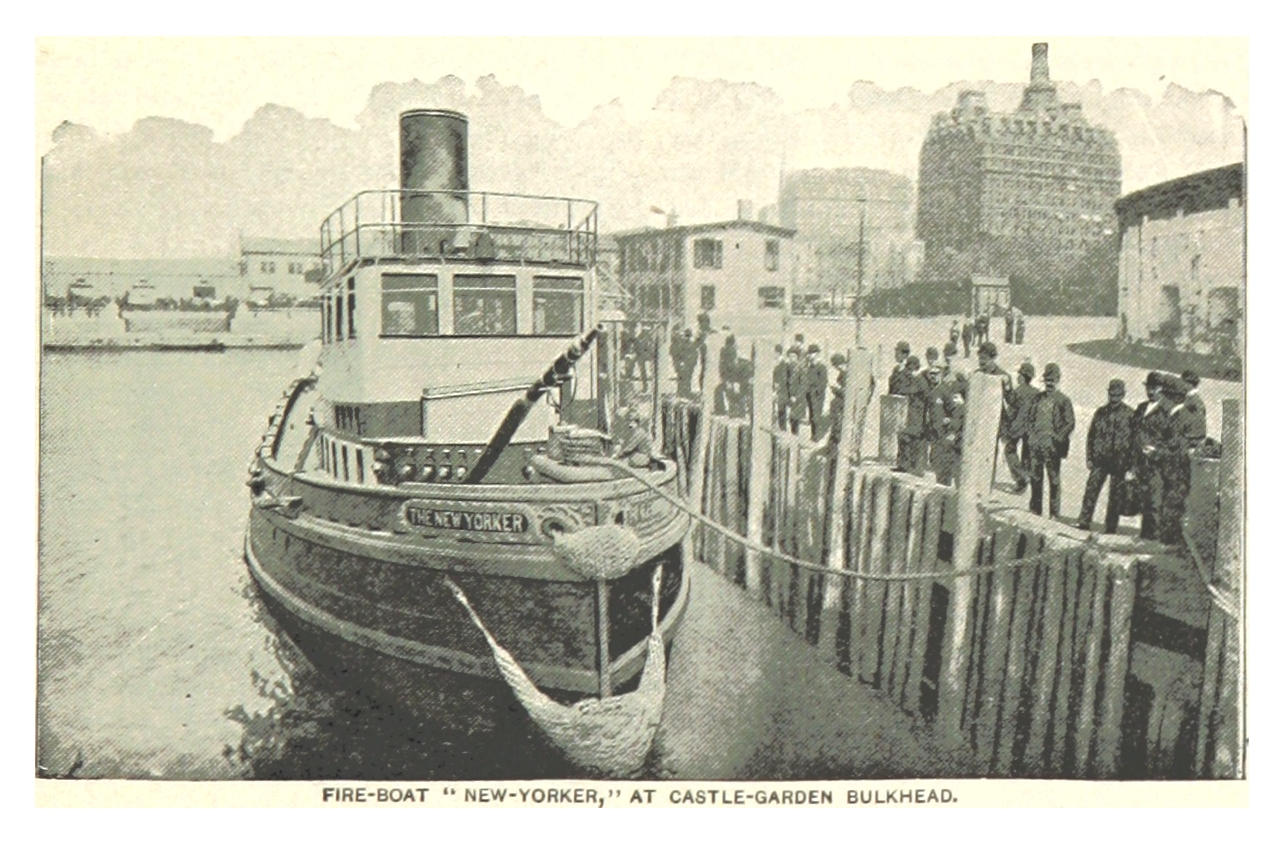
- FDNY fireboat The New Yorker, moored at Castle-Garden

History
- Name: The New Yorker
- Owner: New York City
- Operator: Fire Department of New York City
- Launched: April 5, 1890
- In service: 1890
- Out of service: 1931

General characteristics
- Type: Fireboat

The New Yorker was a fireboat operated by the Fire Department of New York City from 1890 to 1931. She was launched on April 5, 1890 in the presence of Fire Commissioner S. Howland Robbins.

Her pumps were capable of projecting 13,000 gallons per minute. As the Fire Department's most powerful vessel she was considered the fleet's flagship, until her retirement in 1931, when she was replaced by John J. Harvey.

== Operational career ==
On January 18, 1909, the crew of The New Yorker rescued a young woman who had slipped on the ice on the seawall near their boat, and fallen into the river. Two observers had jumped in after Albertine Decquer, and the fireboat's crew rescued all three.

On June 9, 1922, The New Yorker rescued Fannie Schecht, a well-dressed young woman who was seen trying to make her way to shore, in the middle of the Hudson.

== See also ==
- Fireboats in New York City
