= Sheep Island, County Antrim =

Uninhabited island and protected area, Northern Ireland

Coordinates: 55°14′54″N 6°21′07″W

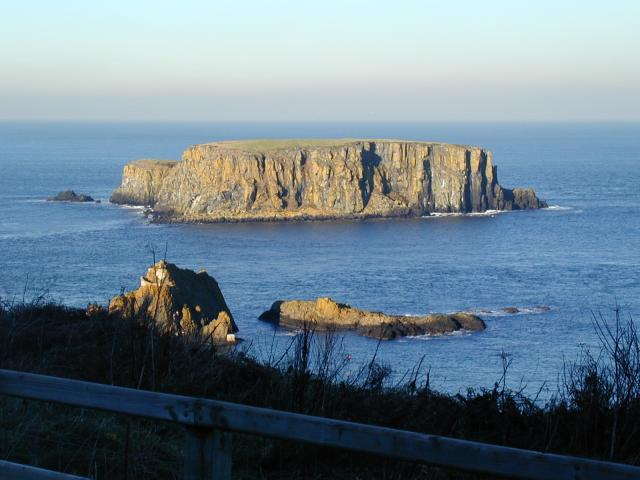
View of the island from Ballintoy Demesne

Sheep Island is an uninhabited island off the north coast of County Antrim, Northern Ireland, close to Ballintoy.

The island has an area of 3.5 hectares, and is located 0.5 km off the coast. It is known for its steep cliffs (one of which is near-vertical and more than 20m in height) and rocky shores. The top of the island is domed and covered with soil.

The island has a registered owner. It is designated as a Special Protection Area and an Area of Special Scientific Interest because it contains a number of a particular species of cormorant, which is known as Phalacrocorax carbo carbo. This population amounts to more than 5% of the population in the whole of Ireland. The island also hosts shag, fulmar, kittiwake, greater black-backed gull, razorbill, black guillemot and guillemot.
