= SS Frank H. Goodyear =

Two merchant ships have been named SS Frank H. Goodyear including:

- SS Frank H. Goodyear (1902), a US bulk freighter launched in 1902 and lost on Lake Huron in 1910.
- SS Frank H. Goodyear (1917), a US bulk freighter launched in 1917 and scrapped in 1985.
