= SMS S32 (1886) =

History

German Empire
- Name: SMS S32
- Builder: Schichau-Werke, Elbing
- Launched: 12 November 1886
- Completed: 8 December 1886
- Fate: Sunk in collision with SMS S76 on 17 August 1910

General characteristics
- Displacement: 119 t (117 long tons) design
- Length: 39.12 m (128 ft 4 in)
- Beam: 5.30 m (17 ft 5 in)
- Draught: 2.52 m (8 ft 3 in)
- Installed power: 900 PS (890 ihp; 660 kW)
- Propulsion: 1 × Triple expansion steam engine
- Speed: 19.9 kn (22.9 mph; 36.9 km/h)
- Complement: 20
- Armament: 3× 35 cm (14 in) torpedo tubes

SMS S32 (Note: "SMS" stands for "Seiner Majestät Schiff" (transl. His Majesty's Ship)) (Note: The "S" in S32 denoted the shipbuilder who constructed her, in this case Schichau.), was a torpedo boat of the Imperial German Navy. She was built in 1886 by Schichau at Elbing, as one of a large number of small torpedo boats of similar design built for the German navy. S32 was sunk in a collision with the torpedo boat S76 in the Baltic Sea on 17 August 1910.

== Design and construction ==
In 1884, the Imperial German Navy started to build up a force of torpedo boats, ordering a number of prototypes from several shipyards, both at home and abroad. Following delivery of these prototypes, the Schichau-Werke became the principle supplier of torpedo boats to the German Navy, a position it held for many years, with large orders for torpedo boats of similar, but gradually improving design being placed.

S32 was launched from Schichau's shipyard at Elbing, East Prussia (now Elbląg in Poland) on 12 November 1886 and completed on 8 December 1886. The ship was 39.12 metres (128 ft 4 in) long, with a beam of 5.30 metres (17 ft 5 in) and a draught of 2.52 metres (8 ft 3 in). Displacement was 119 tonnes (117 long tons). She was powered by a three-cylinder Triple expansion steam engine, rated at 900 metric horsepower (890 ihp; 660 kW), which drove a single shaft, giving a speed of 19.9 knots (22.9 mph; 36.9 km/h).

S32 carried three 35 cm (14 in) torpedo tubes, with a single spare torpedo carried. The ship's initial gun armament consisted of a single Hotchkiss Revolving Cannon, (Note: Two Hotchkiss guns according to Conway's.) which was replaced by a 5 cm SK L/40 gun from 1893. The ship had a crew of 20.

== Service ==
S32 was serving as a training boat as part of the 1st Torpedo Division at Kiel in 1894, and remained on the same duty in 1899. From 5 June 1910, S32 served as the tender for the light cruiser Danzig, which was attached to the naval artillery inspectorate to train the fleet's gunners. On the night of 16/17 August, she was involved in a collision with the torpedo boat S76 in the Kieler Förde. Danzig came to both boats' aid and took off their crews. Both boats sank, although S76 was later salvaged and returned to service.
