= German submarine U-535 =

German World War II submarine

History

Nazi Germany
- Name: U-535
- Ordered: 10 April 1941
- Builder: Deutsche Werft, Hamburg
- Yard number: 353
- Laid down: 6 March 1942
- Launched: 8 October 1942
- Commissioned: 23 December 1942
- Fate: Sunk on 5 July 1943

General characteristics
- Class & type: Type IXC/40 submarine
- Displacement: 1,144 t (1,126 long tons) surfaced; 1,257 t (1,237 long tons) submerged
- Length: 76.76 m (251 ft 10 in) o/a; 58.75 m (192 ft 9 in) pressure hull
- Beam: 6.86 m (22 ft 6 in) o/a; 4.44 m (14 ft 7 in) pressure hull
- Height: 9.60 m (31 ft 6 in)
- Draught: 4.67 m (15 ft 4 in)
- Installed power: 4,400 PS (3,200 kW; 4,300 bhp) (diesels); 1,000 PS (740 kW; 990 shp) (electric)
- Propulsion: 2 shafts; 2 × diesel engines; 2 × electric motors
- Speed: 18.3 knots (33.9 km/h; 21.1 mph) surfaced; 7.3 knots (13.5 km/h; 8.4 mph) submerged
- Range: 13,850 nmi (25,650 km; 15,940 mi) at 10 knots (19 km/h; 12 mph) surfaced; 63 nmi (117 km; 72 mi) at 4 knots (7.4 km/h; 4.6 mph) submerged
- Test depth: 230 m (750 ft)
- Complement: 4 officers, 44 enlisted
- Armament: 6 × torpedo tubes (4 bow, 2 stern); 22 × 53.3 cm (21 in) torpedoes; 1 × 10.5 cm (4.1 in) SK C/32 deck gun (180 rounds); 1 × 3.7 cm (1.5 in) SK C/30 AA gun; 1 × twin 2 cm FlaK 30 AA guns

Service record
- Part of: 4th U-boat Flotilla; 23 December 1942 – 31 May 1943; 10th U-boat Flotilla; 1 June – 5 July 1943
- Identification codes: M 49 383
- Commanders: Kptlt. Helmut Ellmenreich; 23 December 1942 – 5 July 1943
- Operations: 1 patrol: 25 May – 5 July 1943
- Victories: None

German submarine U-535 was a Type IXC/40 U-boat of Nazi Germany's Kriegsmarine during World War II. The submarine was laid down on 6 March 1942 at the Deutsche Werft yard at Hamburg, launched on 8 October 1942, and commissioned on 23 December 1942 under the command of Kapitänleutnant Helmut Ellmenreich. After training with 4th U-boat Flotilla in the Baltic Sea, U-535 was transferred to 10th U-boat Flotilla for front-line service. U-535 completed one patrol, but did not sink any ships.

== Design ==
German Type IXC/40 submarines were slightly larger than the original Type IXCs. U-535 had a displacement of 1,144 tonnes (1,126 long tons) when at the surface and 1,257 tonnes (1,237 long tons) while submerged. The U-boat had a total length of 76.76 m (251 ft 10 in), a pressure hull length of 58.75 m (192 ft 9 in), a beam of 6.86 m (22 ft 6 in), a height of 9.60 m (31 ft 6 in), and a draught of 4.67 m (15 ft 4 in). The submarine was powered by two MAN M 9 V 40/46 supercharged four-stroke, nine-cylinder diesel engines producing a total of 4,400 metric horsepower (3,240 kW; 4,340 shp) for use while surfaced, two Siemens-Schuckert 2 GU 345/34 double-acting electric motors producing a total of 1,000 shaft horsepower (1,010 PS; 750 kW) for use while submerged. She had two shafts and two 1.92 m (6 ft) propellers. The boat was capable of operating at depths of up to 230 metres (750 ft).

The submarine had a maximum surface speed of 18.3 knots (33.9 km/h; 21.1 mph) and a maximum submerged speed of 7.3 knots (13.5 km/h; 8.4 mph). When submerged, the boat could operate for 63 nautical miles (117 km; 72 mi) at 4 knots (7.4 km/h; 4.6 mph); when surfaced, she could travel 13,850 nautical miles (25,650 km; 15,940 mi) at 10 knots (19 km/h; 12 mph). U-535 was fitted with six 53.3 cm (21 in) torpedo tubes (four fitted at the bow and two at the stern), 22 torpedoes, one 10.5 cm (4.13 in) SK C/32 naval gun, 180 rounds, and a 3.7 cm (1.5 in) SK C/30 as well as a 2 cm (0.79 in) C/30 anti-aircraft gun. The boat had a complement of forty-eight.

== Service history ==
U-535 sailed from Kiel on 25 May 1943 on her first and only war patrol in the north Atlantic.

On 8 June at about 14:00, the U-boat was attacked with depth charges by a Hudson light bomber from No. 269 Squadron RAF, close to Convoy SC 132. A follow-up attack by another Hudson from the same squadron was aborted when the depth charges failed to release in two attack runs. The aircraft was damaged by the U-boat's flak, and the pilot warned an arriving United States Navy Catalina patrol bomber of Squadron VP-84 that the boat would stay up and fight, so the flying boat shadowed U-535 until it escaped at dusk.

=== Sinking ===
At 16:55 on 5 July 1943, a group of three inbound U-boats; U-170, U-535 and U-536 were attacked by a British Liberator maritime reconnaissance aircraft of No. 53 Squadron RAF, north-east of Cape Finisterre, Spain. The U-boats evaded the first attack, and U-536 was strafed in the second. U-536 gave the signal to crash-dive, but for unknown reasons U-535 remained on the surface. Despite hitting the aircraft with her AA guns, the U-boat was straddled by eight depth charges and sank with all hands in position 43°38′N 09°13′W. Damaged and with one crewman wounded, the aircraft immediately left the area and returned to base.

== Bibliography ==
- Bishop, Chris (2006). Kriegsmarine U-Boats, 1939–45. London: Amber Books. ISBN 978-1-904687-96-2.
- Busch, Rainer; Röll, Hans-Joachim (1999). German U-boat commanders of World War II : a biographical dictionary. Translated by Brooks, Geoffrey. London, Annapolis, Md: Greenhill Books, Naval Institute Press. ISBN 1-55750-186-6.
- Busch, Rainer; Röll, Hans-Joachim (1999). Deutsche U-Boot-Verluste von September 1939 bis Mai 1945 [German U-boat losses from September 1939 to May 1945]. Der U-Boot-Krieg (in German). Vol. IV. Hamburg, Berlin, Bonn: Mittler. ISBN 3-8132-0514-2.
- Gröner, Erich; Jung, Dieter; Maass, Martin (1991). U-boats and Mine Warfare Vessels. German Warships 1815–1945. Vol. 2. Translated by Thomas, Keith; Magowan, Rachel. London: Conway Maritime Press. ISBN 0-85177-593-4.
