= German submarine U-526 =

German World War II submarine

Coordinates: 06.20°S 111.28°E

History

Nazi Germany
- Name: U-526
- Ordered: 15 August 1940
- Builder: Deutsche Werft, Hamburg
- Yard number: 341
- Laid down: 14 October 1941
- Launched: 3 June 1942
- Commissioned: 12 August 1942
- Fate: Sunk by mines in the Bay of Biscay on 14 April 1943

General characteristics
- Class & type: Type IXC/40 submarine
- Displacement: 1,144 t (1,126 long tons) surfaced; 1,257 t (1,237 long tons) submerged
- Length: 76.76 m (251 ft 10 in) o/a; 58.75 m (192 ft 9 in) pressure hull
- Beam: 6.86 m (22 ft 6 in) o/a 4.44 m (14 ft 7 in) pressure hull
- Height: 9.60 m (31 ft 6 in)
- Draught: 4.67 m (15 ft 4 in)
- Installed power: 4,400 PS (3,200 kW; 4,300 bhp) (diesels); 1,000 PS (740 kW; 990 shp) (electric)
- Propulsion: 2 shafts; 2 × diesel engines; 2 × electric motors
- Speed: 18.3 knots (33.9 km/h; 21.1 mph) surfaced; 7.3 knots (13.5 km/h; 8.4 mph) submerged
- Range: 13,850 nmi (25,650 km; 15,940 mi) at 10 knots (19 km/h; 12 mph) surfaced; 63 nmi (117 km; 72 mi) at 4 knots (7.4 km/h; 4.6 mph) submerged
- Test depth: 230 m (750 ft)
- Complement: 4 officers, 44 enlisted
- Armament: 6 × torpedo tubes (4 bow, 2 stern); 22 × 53.3 cm (21 in) torpedoes; 1 × 10.5 cm (4.1 in) SK C/32 deck gun (180 rounds); 1 × 3.7 cm (1.5 in) SK C/30 AA gun; 1 × twin 2 cm FlaK 30 AA guns

Service record
- Part of: 4th U-boat Flotilla; 12 August 1942 – 31 January 1943; 10th U-boat Flotilla; 1 February – 14 April 1943
- Identification codes: M 49 572
- Commanders: Kptlt. Hans Möglich; 12 August 1942 – 14 April 1943
- Operations: 1 patrol: 11 February – 14 April 1943
- Victories: None

German submarine U-526 was a Type IXC/40 U-boat of Nazi Germany's Kriegsmarine built for service during World War II.

Her keel was laid down on 14 October 1941 by the Deutsche Werft in Hamburg as yard number 341. She was launched on 3 June 1942 and commissioned on 12 August with Kapitänleutnant Hans Möglich in command.

The U-boat's service began with training as part of the 4th U-boat Flotilla on 12 August 1942. She then moved to the 10th flotilla on 1 February 1943 for operations.

She was a member of four wolfpacks.

She carried out one patrol and sank no ships.

She was sunk by mines in the Bay of Biscay on 14 April 1943.

== Design and construction ==
German Type IXC/40 submarines were slightly larger than the original Type IXCs. U-526 had a displacement of 1,144 tonnes (1,126 long tons) when at the surface and 1,257 tonnes (1,237 long tons) while submerged. The U-boat had a total length of 76.76 m (251 ft 10 in), a pressure hull length of 58.75 m (192 ft 9 in), a beam of 6.86 m (22 ft 6 in), a height of 9.60 m (31 ft 6 in), and a draught of 4.67 m (15 ft 4 in). The submarine was powered by two MAN M 9 V 40/46 supercharged four-stroke, nine-cylinder diesel engines producing a total of 4,400 metric horsepower (3,240 kW; 4,340 shp) for use while surfaced, two Siemens-Schuckert 2 GU 345/34 double-acting electric motors producing a total of 1,000 shaft horsepower (1,010 PS; 750 kW) for use while submerged. She had two shafts and two 1.92 m (6 ft) propellers. The boat was capable of operating at depths of up to 230 metres (750 ft).

The submarine had a maximum surface speed of 18.3 knots (33.9 km/h; 21.1 mph) and a maximum submerged speed of 7.3 knots (13.5 km/h; 8.4 mph). When submerged, the boat could operate for 63 nautical miles (117 km; 72 mi) at 4 knots (7.4 km/h; 4.6 mph); when surfaced, she could travel 13,850 nautical miles (25,650 km; 15,940 mi) at 10 knots (19 km/h; 12 mph). U-526 was fitted with six 53.3 cm (21 in) torpedo tubes (four fitted at the bow and two at the stern), 22 torpedoes, one 10.5 cm (4.13 in) SK C/32 naval gun, 180 rounds, and a 3.7 cm (1.5 in) SK C/30 as well as a 2 cm (0.79 in) C/30 anti-aircraft gun. The boat had a complement of forty-eight.

U-526 was laid down at Deutsche Werft's Hamburg shipyard on 14 October 1941, as Yard number 341. She was launched on 3 June 1942 and commissioned on 12 August 1942.

== Service history ==
Following commissioning, U-526, under the command of Kapitänleutnant Hans Möglich, joined the 4th U-boat Flotilla based at Stettin, for training.

=== Patrol and loss ===
The submarine's only patrol was preceded by short passages from Kiel in Germany to Kristiansand then Bergen in Norway over January 1943. She joined the operational 10th U-boat Flotilla on 1 February 1943, and left Bergen on 11 February 1943 bound for the North Atlantic, crossing the North Sea and passing into the Atlantic Ocean through the 'gap' between Iceland and the Faroe Islands. U-526 was ordered to join the patrol group Burggraf, which formed on 26 February north of the Azores and swept westward, joining up with group Wildfang east of Newfoundland. After Convoy SC 121 was spotted by U-405 on 6 March, U-526 was one of 17 U-boats directed to form group Westmark and attack SC 121. The Westmark U-boats attacked the convoy in a heavy storm on 7–8 March, sinking eight merchant ships. (Note: Some sources claim that U-256 may have sunk the British freighter Guido, a straggler from the convoy, on 8 March, although no attack report was received covering the sinking of this ship. Wynn states that U-526 probably sank Guido, while Blair and Rohwer state that Guido may have been sunk by either U-526 or U-432. Uboat.net credits Guido's sinking to U-633. None of the three U-boats survived to make port.) On 14 March U-526 joined group Stürmer, south of Iceland, which from 16 March took part in attacks against Convoys HX 229 and SC 122. While 21 allied ships were sunk for the loss of 1 U-boat in what has been described as the largest convoy battle of the war, U-526 had no success, as problems with her engines forced her to break off pursuit of the convoy. On 24 March U-526 joined group Seeteufel as it attempted to intercept Convoys ONS 1 and HX 230, but had no success, and in early April set course for her new base of Lorient, refuelling from the tanker submarine U-430.

After crossing the Bay of Biscay, U-526 rendezvoused with the submarine U-513 and a minesweeper escort outside Lorient on 14 April 1943. At 1 nmi (1.2 mi; 1.9 km) from the port, the minesweeper escort turned away and U-526 moved ahead of U-513, (Note: Normal practice would be that U-513, as the senior boat, would lead U-526 into port.) before striking a British mine. U-526 was blown in two, with 42 men killed, including Möglich, with 12 survivors, 9 of whom were injured. Two of the survivors were picked up by U-513, with three rescued from the sunken submarine at a depth of 9.1 m (30 ft) by divers. The wreck of U-513 was later raised and her engines salvaged.

== Bibliography ==
- Blair, Clay (2000). Hitler's U-Boat War: The Hunted, 1942–1945. New York: Modern Library. ISBN 0-679-64033-9.
- Busch, Rainer; Röll, Hans-Joachim (1999). German U-boat commanders of World War II : a biographical dictionary. Translated by Brooks, Geoffrey. London, Annapolis, Md: Greenhill Books, Naval Institute Press. ISBN 1-55750-186-6.
- Busch, Rainer; Röll, Hans-Joachim (1999). Deutsche U-Boot-Verluste von September 1939 bis Mai 1945 [German U-boat losses from September 1939 to May 1945]. Der U-Boot-Krieg (in German). Vol. IV. Hamburg, Berlin, Bonn: Mittler. ISBN 3-8132-0514-2.
- Gröner, Erich; Jung, Dieter; Maass, Martin (1985). Die deutschen Kriegschiffe 1815–1945: Band 3: U-Boote, Hilfskreuzer, Minenschiffe, Netzleger, Sperrbrecher (in German). Koblenz, Germany: Bernard & Grafe Verlag. ISBN 3-7637-4802-4.
- Gröner, Erich; Jung, Dieter; Maass, Martin (1991). U-boats and Mine Warfare Vessels. German Warships 1815–1945. Vol. 2. Translated by Thomas, Keith; Magowan, Rachel. London: Conway Maritime Press. ISBN 0-85177-593-4.
- Kemp, Paul (1997). U-Boats Destroyed – German Submarine Losses in the World Wars. Arms & Armour. ISBN 1-85409-515-3.
- Rohwer, Jürgen (1983). Axis Submarine Successes 1939–45. Annapolis, Maryland, US: Naval Institute Press. ISBN 0-87021-082-3.
- Sharpe, Peter (1998). U-Boat Fact File. Leicester, UK: Midland Publishing Limited. ISBN 1-85780-072-9.
- Wynn, Kenneth (1998). U-Boat Operations of the Second World War: Volume 2: Career Histories, U511–UIT25. London: Chatham Publishing. ISBN 1-86176-069-8.
