= German submarine U-1229 =

German World War II submarine

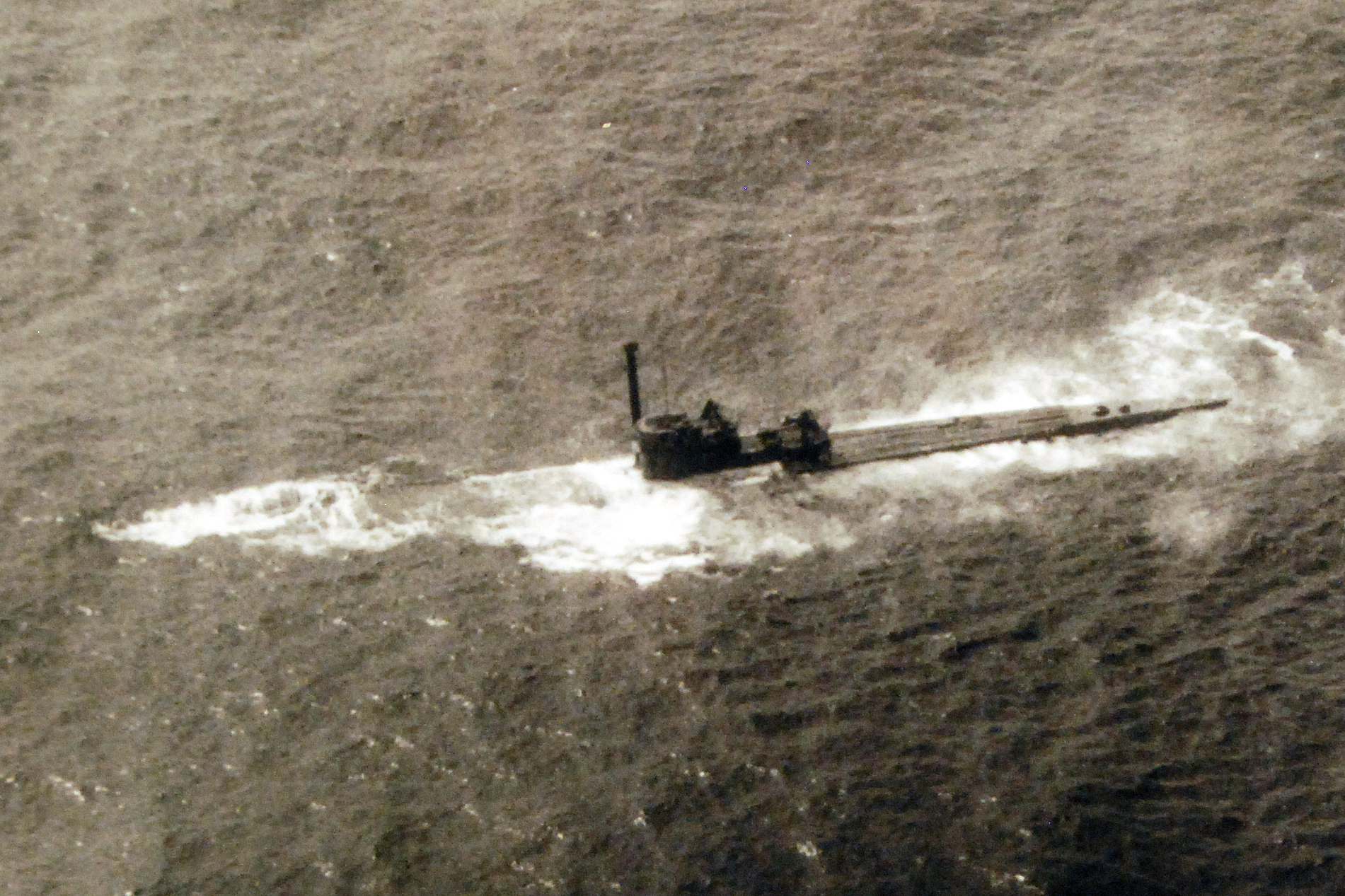
- U-1229 on the day of its sinking

History

Nazi Germany
- Name: U-1229
- Ordered: 14 October 1941
- Builder: Deutsche Werft AG, Hamburg
- Yard number: 392
- Laid down: 2 March 1943
- Launched: 22 October 1943
- Commissioned: 13 January 1944
- Fate: Sunk on 20 August 1944 by Allied aircraft in position 42°20′N 51°39′W, 18 dead, 41 survivors

General characteristics
- Class & type: Type IXC/40 submarine
- Displacement: 1,144 t (1,126 long tons) surfaced; 1,257 t (1,237 long tons) submerged
- Length: 76.76 m (251 ft 10 in) o/a; 58.75 m (192 ft 9 in) pressure hull
- Beam: 6.86 m (22 ft 6 in) o/a; 4.44 m (14 ft 7 in) pressure hull
- Height: 9.60 m (31 ft 6 in)
- Draught: 4.67 m (15 ft 4 in)
- Installed power: 4,400 PS (3,200 kW; 4,300 bhp) (diesels); 1,000 PS (740 kW; 990 shp) (electric)
- Propulsion: 2 shafts; 2 × diesel engines; 2 × electric motors
- Speed: 18.3 knots (33.9 km/h; 21.1 mph) surfaced; 7.3 knots (13.5 km/h; 8.4 mph) submerged
- Range: 13,850 nmi (25,650 km; 15,940 mi) at 10 knots (19 km/h; 12 mph) surfaced; 63 nmi (117 km; 72 mi) at 4 knots (7.4 km/h; 4.6 mph) submerged
- Test depth: 230 m (750 ft)
- Complement: 4 officers, 44 enlisted
- Armament: 6 × torpedo tubes (4 bow, 2 stern); 22 × 53.3 cm (21 in) torpedoes; 1 × 3.7 cm (1.5 in) Flak M42 AA gun; 2 x twin 2 cm (0.79 in) C/30 AA guns

Service record
- Part of: 31st U-boat Flotilla; 13 January – 31 July 1944; 10th U-boat Flotilla; 1 – 20 August 1944
- Identification codes: M 55 295
- Commanders: Kptlt. / K.Kapt. Arnim Zinke; 13 January – 20 August 1944
- Operations: 1 patrol: 26 July – 20 August 1944
- Victories: None

German submarine U-1229 was a Type IXC/40 U-boat built for Nazi Germany's Kriegsmarine during World War II.

== Design ==
German Type IXC/40 submarines were slightly larger than the original Type IXCs. U-1229 had a displacement of 1,144 tonnes (1,126 long tons) when at the surface and 1,257 tonnes (1,237 long tons) while submerged. The U-boat had a total length of 76.76 m (251 ft 10 in), a pressure hull length of 58.75 m (192 ft 9 in), a beam of 6.86 m (22 ft 6 in), a height of 9.60 m (31 ft 6 in), and a draught of 4.67 m (15 ft 4 in). The submarine was powered by two MAN M 9 V 40/46 supercharged four-stroke, nine-cylinder diesel engines producing a total of 4,400 metric horsepower (3,240 kW; 4,340 shp) for use while surfaced, two Siemens-Schuckert 2 GU 345/34 double-acting electric motors producing a total of 1,000 shaft horsepower (1,010 PS; 750 kW) for use while submerged. She had two shafts and two 1.92 m (6 ft) propellers. The boat was capable of operating at depths of up to 230 metres (750 ft).

The submarine had a maximum surface speed of 18.3 knots (33.9 km/h; 21.1 mph) and a maximum submerged speed of 7.3 knots (13.5 km/h; 8.4 mph). When submerged, the boat could operate for 63 nautical miles (117 km; 72 mi) at 4 knots (7.4 km/h; 4.6 mph); when surfaced, she could travel 13,850 nautical miles (25,650 km; 15,940 mi) at 10 knots (19 km/h; 12 mph). U-1229 was fitted with six 53.3 cm (21 in) torpedo tubes (four fitted at the bow and two at the stern), 22 torpedoes, and a 3.7 cm (1.5 in) Flak M42 as well as two twin 2 cm (0.79 in) C/30 anti-aircraft guns. The boat had a complement of forty-eight.

== Service history ==
U-1229 was ordered on 14 October 1941 from Deutsche Werft AG Weser in Hamburg-Finkenwerder under the yard number 392. Her keel was laid down on 2 March 1943 and was launched on 22 October 1943. About three months later she was commissioned into service under the command of Kapitänleutnant Arnim Zinke (Crew 31) in the 31st U-boat Flotilla on 13 January 1944.

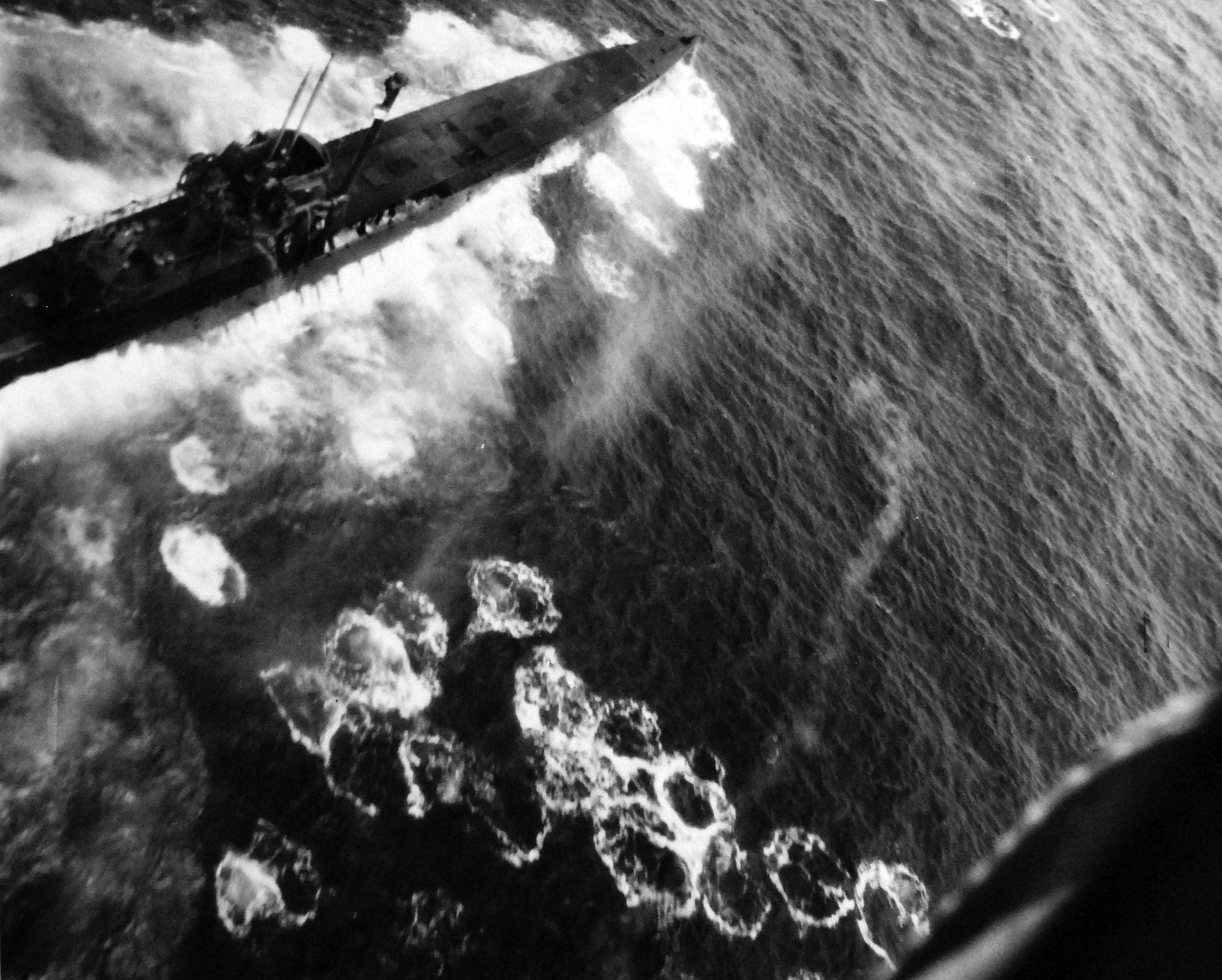
U-1229 under attack from U.S. Navy aircraft

After completing training and work-up for deployment, U-1229 was transferred to the 10th U-boat Flotilla for front-line service on 1 August 1944. The U-boat left Kiel on 13 July 1944 for the first and only war patrol operating unsuccessfully against Allied shipping in the North Atlantic and off the coast of Canada. A special mission to infiltrate an Abwehr agent into the United States failed, when U-1229 was spotted south of Newfoundland by a Radar-equipped aircraft from USS Bogue and subsequently attacked by several more aircraft over a period of two hours. Having been heavily damaged in the initial air attack, U-1229 attempted to escape under water but was forced to surface again as poisonous fumes started to develop from the damaged battery sections. While the crew was abandoning ship, the U-boat was strafed by several aircraft resulting in the death of numerous crew members, including Zinke. In total 18 crew members died while 41 survivors were picked up by a US destroyer after seven hours in the water. One of the survivors was the experienced German intelligence agent Oskar Mantel.

== Bibliography ==
- Busch, Rainer; Röll, Hans-Joachim (1999). German U-boat commanders of World War II : a biographical dictionary. Translated by Brooks, Geoffrey. London, Annapolis, Md: Greenhill Books, Naval Institute Press. ISBN 1-55750-186-6.
- Busch, Rainer; Röll, Hans-Joachim (1999). Deutsche U-Boot-Verluste von September 1939 bis Mai 1945 [German U-boat losses from September 1939 to May 1945]. Der U-Boot-Krieg (in German). Vol. IV. Hamburg, Berlin, Bonn: Mittler. ISBN 3-8132-0514-2.
- Gröner, Erich; Jung, Dieter; Maass, Martin (1991). German Warships 1815–1945, U-boats and Mine Warfare Vessels. Vol. 2. Translated by Thomas, Keith; Magowan, Rachel. London: Conway Maritime Press. ISBN 0-85177-593-4.
