= German submarine U-884 =

German World War II submarine

History

Nazi Germany
- Name: U-884
- Ordered: 2 April 1942
- Builder: DeSchiMAG AG Weser, Bremen
- Yard number: 1092
- Laid down: 29 August 1943
- Launched: 17 May 1944
- Commissioned: Not commissioned
- Fate: Bomb damaged on 30 March 1945

General characteristics
- Class & type: Type IXD/42 submarine
- Displacement: 1,616 t (1,590 long tons) surfaced; 1,804 t (1,776 long tons) submerged; 2,150 t (2,116 long tons) total
- Length: 87.58 m (287 ft 4 in) total; 68.50 m (224 ft 9 in) pressure hull
- Beam: 7.50 m (24 ft 7 in) total; 4.40 m (14 ft 5 in) pressure hull
- Draught: 5.35 m (17 ft 7 in)
- Installed power: 4,400 PS (3,240 kW; 4,340 bhp) (diesels); 1,000 PS (740 kW; 990 shp) (electric)
- Propulsion: 2 shafts; 2 × diesel engines; 2 × electric motors
- Speed: 19.2 knots (35.6 km/h; 22.1 mph) surfaced; 6.9 knots (12.8 km/h; 7.9 mph) submerged
- Complement: 55-64 men
- Armament: 6 × torpedo tubes (4 bow, 2 stern); 24 × torpedoes; 1 × 10.5 cm (4.1 in) deck gun; 1 × 3.7 cm (1.5 in) Flak M42 AA gun; 2 × twin 2 cm (0.79 in) C/30 anti-aircraft guns

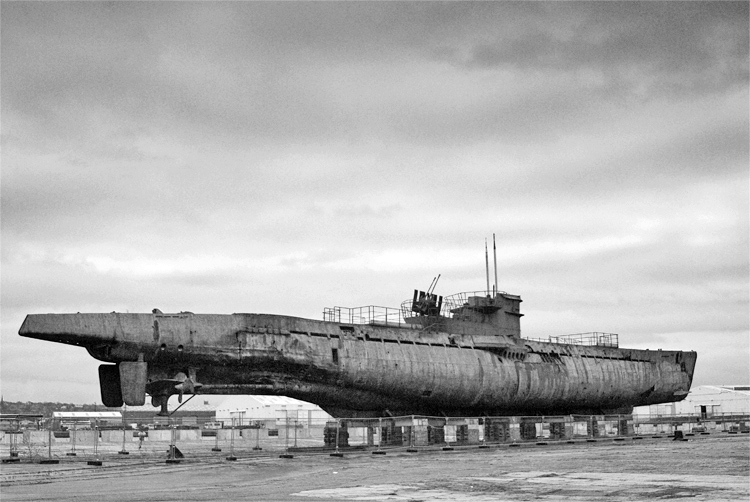

German submarine U-884 was a Type IXD/42 U-boat of Nazi Germany's Kriegsmarine during World War II. Her construction was ordered on 2 April 1942 and her keel was laid down on 29 August 1943 by DeSchiMAG AG Weser of Bremen.

She was launched on 17 May 1944, but was never commissioned, and was badly damaged on 30 March 1945 by United States bombs.

== Design ==
German Type IX/D42 submarines were considerably larger than the original Type IXs. U-884 had a displacement of 1,616 tonnes (1,590 long tons) when at the surface and 1,804 tonnes (1,776 long tons) while submerged. The U-boat had a total length of 87.58 m (287 ft 4 in), a pressure hull length of 68.50 m (224 ft 9 in), a beam of 7.50 m (24 ft 7 in), a height of 10.20 m (33 ft 6 in), and a draught of 5.35 m (17 ft 7 in). The submarine was powered by two MAN M 9 V 40/46 supercharged four-stroke, nine-cylinder diesel engines producing a total of 4,400 metric horsepower (3,240 kW; 4,340 shp) for use while surfaced, two Siemens-Schuckert 2 GU 345/34 double-acting electric motors producing a total of 1,000 shaft horsepower (1,010 PS; 750 kW) for use while submerged. She had two shafts and two 1.85 m (6 ft) propellers. The boat was capable of operating at depths of up to 200 metres (660 ft).

The submarine had a maximum surface speed of 19.2 knots (35.6 km/h; 22.1 mph) and a maximum submerged speed of 6.9 knots (12.8 km/h; 7.9 mph). When submerged, the boat could operate for 121 nautical miles (224 km; 139 mi) at 2 knots (3.7 km/h; 2.3 mph); when surfaced, she could travel 31,500 nautical miles (58,300 km; 36,200 mi) at 10 knots (19 km/h; 12 mph). U-884 was fitted with six 53.3 cm (21 in) torpedo tubes (four fitted at the bow and two at the stern), 24 torpedoes, one 10.5 cm (4.13 in) SK C/32 naval gun, 150 rounds, and a 3.7 cm (1.5 in) Flak M42 with 2575 rounds as well as two 2 cm (0.79 in) C/30 anti-aircraft guns with 8100 rounds. The boat had a complement of fifty-five.

== Bibliography ==
- Busch, Rainer; Röll, Hans-Joachim (1999). German U-boat commanders of World War II : a biographical dictionary. Translated by Brooks, Geoffrey. London, Annapolis, Md: Greenhill Books, Naval Institute Press. ISBN 1-55750-186-6.
- Busch, Rainer; Röll, Hans-Joachim (1999). Der U-Boot-Krieg, 1939-1945: Deutsche U-Boot-Verluste von September 1939 bis Mai 1945 [German U-boat losses from September 1939 to May 1945] (in German). Vol. IV. Hamburg, Berlin, Bonn: Mittler. ISBN 3-8132-0514-2.
- Gröner, Eric; Jung, Dieter; Maass, Martin (1991). German Warships 1815-1945: U-boats and Mine Warfare Vessels. Vol. 2. Translated by Thomas, Keith; Magowan, Rachel. London: Conway Maritime Press. ISBN 0-85177-593-4.
