= SS Campos =

German-built passenger steamship, torpedoed in 1943

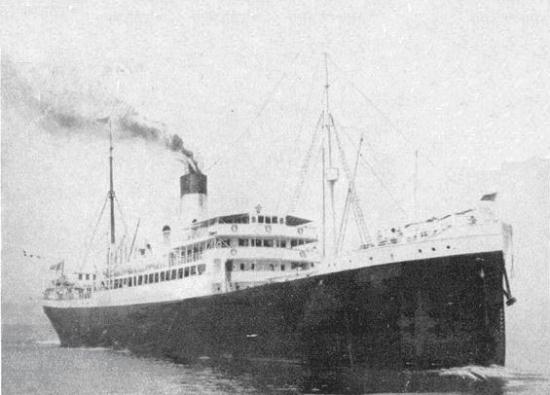
- The ship as Campos

History
- Name: 1895: Asuncion; 1917: Campos
- Namesake: 1895: Asunción; 1917: Campos dos Goytacazes
- Owner: 1895: Hamburg Süd; 1917: Government of Brazil; 1927: Lloyd Brasileiro
- Operator: 1923: Lloyd Brasileiro
- Port of registry: 1895: (German Empire) Hamburg; by 1920: (Brazil) Rio de Janeiro
- Route: 1895: Hamburg – east coast of South America
- Builder: Blohm+Voss, Hamburg
- Yard number: 109
- Launched: 4 September 1895
- Completed: 16 October 1895
- Maiden voyage: 31 October 1895
- Identification: 1896: code letters RKHG; by 1914: call sign DAC; by 1934: call sign PUAP
- Fate: sunk by torpedo, October 1943

General characteristics
- Class & type: Asuncion-class Kombischiff
- Tonnage: 4,663 GRT, 3,034 NRT, 6,469 DWT
- Length: 375.0 ft (114.3 m)
- Beam: 46.0 ft (14.0 m)
- Depth: 27.6 ft (8.4 m)
- Decks: 2
- Installed power: 1 × quadruple-expansion engine: 302 NHP; 1,800 ihp (1,300 kW)
- Propulsion: 1 × screw
- Speed: 10 1/2 knots (19 km/h; 12 mph)
- Capacity: 1895: 264 passengers: 24 × 1st class; 440 × steerage
- Crew: 48

SS Campos was a merchant steamship. She was what in German as a Kombischiff, a term roughly equivalent to "cargo liner" in English. She was built in Germany in 1895 as the mail steamer Asuncion for Hamburg Südamerikanische DG. She was the lead ship of a class of 11 ships in Hamburg Süd's fleet.

For nearly two decades, Asuncion carried emigrants and cargo on a regular route between Hamburg and the east coast of South America. In the early weeks of the First World War, she was an auxiliary ship for the Imperial German Navy in the South Atlantic. That November, she took refuge in a port in neutral Brazil.

In 1917, after Germany started sinking Brazilian merchant ships, the Brazilian government seized her and renamed her Campos. Lloyd Brasileiro was managing her by 1923, and owned her by 1927. In 1924, during the state of emergency in Brazil, she was a government prison ship. In 1943 a German U-boat sank her, killing 12 people.

She was the first of two Hamburg Süd ships to be named after Asunción, the capital of Paraguay. The second was a refrigerated cargo steamship that was built for Hamburg America Line (HAPAG) in 1921 as Niederwald. Hamburg Süd chartered her from 1934, and bought and renamed her in 1936. A mine sank her in 1942.

== Asuncion-class ships ==
In 1895, Hamburg Süd took delivery of a set of three new mail steamers from Hamburg shipyards for its route between Hamburg and the east coast of South America. Blohm+Voss built Asuncion, followed by Tucuman, while Reiherstiegwerft built Cordoba. Each ship had a single screw, driven by a quadruple-expansion engine that was designed for economy. They carried both first class and steerage passengers, and the accommodation was more comfortable than that of earlier Hamburg Süd ships on the route.

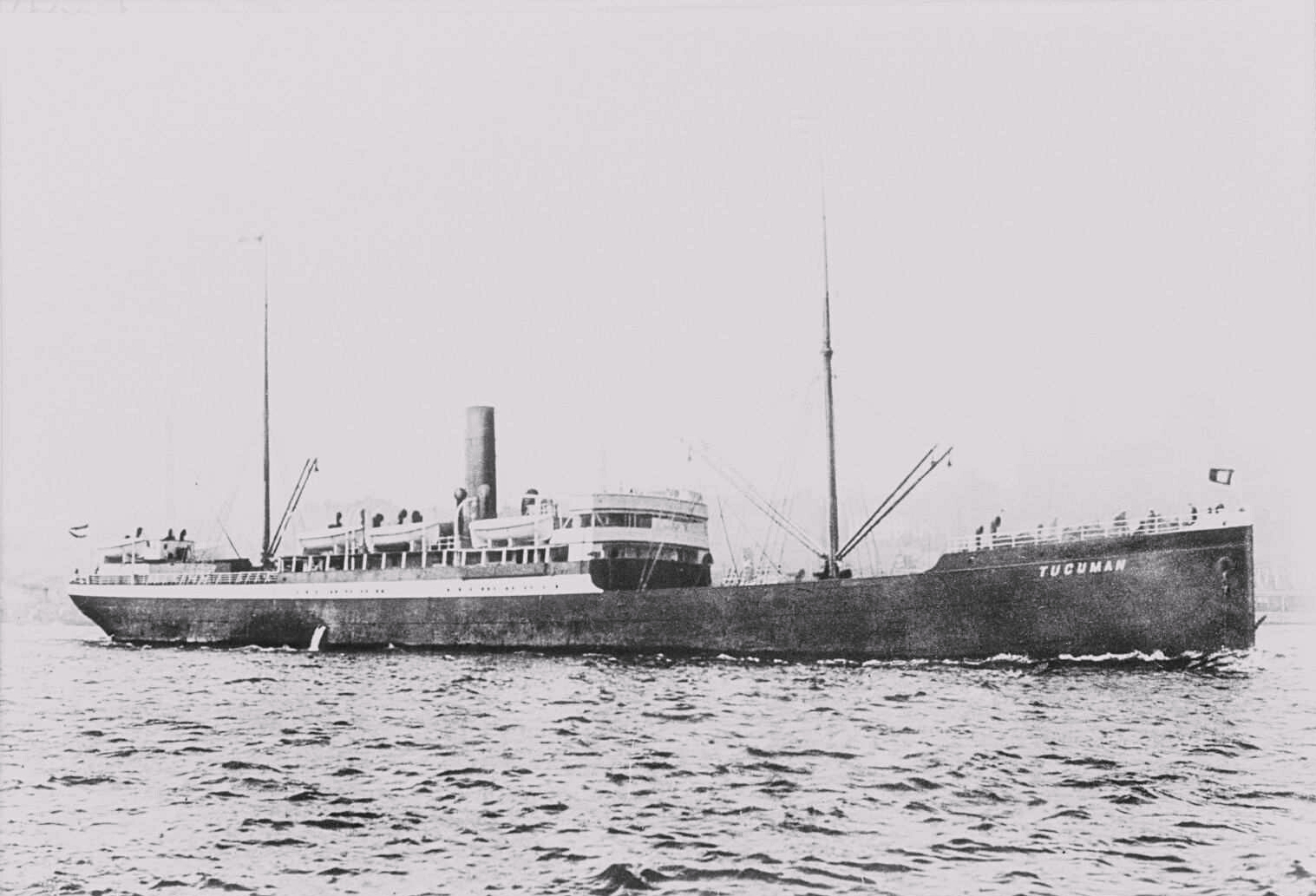
Tucuman, the first Asuncion-class ship built by Reiherstiegwerft

The trio proved reliable, popular, and competitive, so Hamburg Süd ordered more ships to the same design. Blohm+Voss completed Sao Paolo in 1896; Pernambuco and San Nicolas in 1897; and Tijuca in 1899. Reiherstiegwerft completed Petropolis and Belgrano in 1897; Bahia in 1898; and Santos in 1899.

== Building and registration ==
Blohm+Voss built Asuncion as yard number 109. She was launched on 4 September 1895, and completed on 16 October. Her registered length was 375.0 ft (114.3 m); her beam was 46.0 ft (14.0 m); and her depth was 27.6 ft (8.4 m). She had berths for 24 passengers in first class, and 440 in steerage. Her tonnages were 4,663 gross register tons (GRT); 3,034 net register tons (NRT); and 6,469 tons deadweight (DWT). Blohm+Voss built Asuncion's quadruple-expansion engine. It was rated at 302 nhp or 1,800 indicated horsepower (1,300 kW), and gave her a speed of 10 1/2 knots (19 km/h; 12 mph).

Hamburg Süd registered Asuncion in Hamburg. Her code letters were RKHG. On 31 October she left Hamburg on her maiden voyage, which was to Santos in Brazil. By 1914 she was equipped with wireless telegraphy. Her call sign was DAC.

== First World War ==
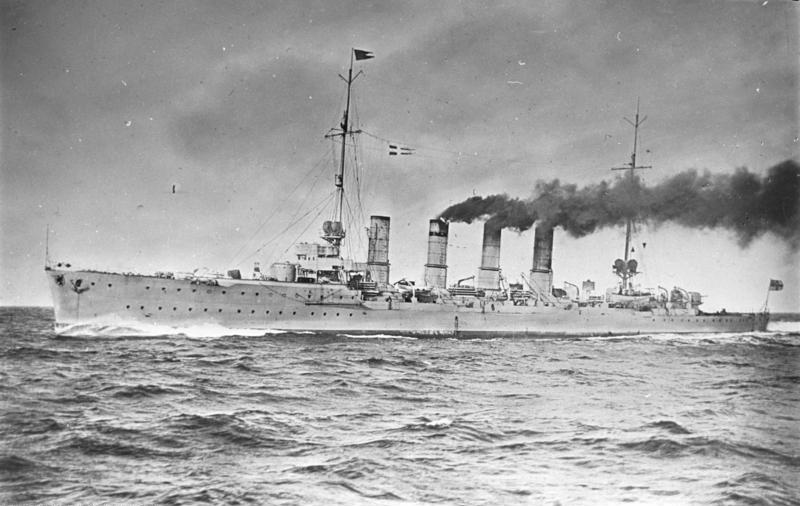
The German light cruiser SMS Karlsruhe

On 3 August 1914, Germany declared war on France and Russia. The next day, the United Kingdom declared war on Germany, and Asuncion took refuge in Santos to avoid Entente naval patrols.

However, the Imperial German Navy requisitioned her as an auxiliary ship, so she later left Santos with fresh food, spare parts, and 1,200 tons of coal for the light cruiser SMS Karlsruhe. The two ships met near Lavandeira Reef, off the north coast of Brazil, on 31 August. They were joined by the Norddeutscher Lloyd (NDL) steamship Crefeld, which had come from Rio de Janeiro; and Hamburg Süd's Rio Negro, which had come from Belém.

Asuncion also assisted the auxiliary cruiser SMS Kronprinz Wilhelm.

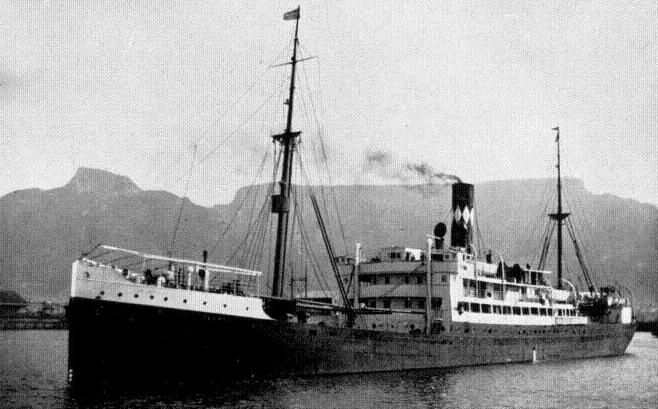
Ellerman Lines' City of Palermo; formerly Hamburg Süd's Rio Negro

On 23 October, the Daily Mail's reporter in Tenerife reported that NDL's Crefeld had arrived there the previous day; carrying the interned crews of British merchant ships that Karlsruhe had captured and sunk. The report added that three other German merchant ships accompanied Crefeld into Santa Cruz de Tenerife: Hamburg Süd's Asuncion and Rio Negro; and HAPAG's Patagonia.

On 26 October, Karlsruhe captured the Lamport and Holt liner Vandyck about 690 miles west of St Paul's Rocks. She carried more than 200 passengers; many of whom were US citizens. That night, Asuncion; Rio Negro; and a prize ship, the captured British Indrani; all rendezvoused with Karlsruhe and Vandyck. The next day, the Germans transferred Vandyck's interned crew and passengers to Asuncion; a total of 419 people; with a party of marines to guard them. Karlsruhe then sank Vandyck. Asuncion carried also the interned crews of four other ships that Karlsruhe had captured. She took them to Belém in Brazil, where she arrived on 1 or 2 November. Thereafter, Asuncion remained in port in Belém.

== Campos ==
In February 1917, Germany resumed unrestricted submarine warfare. That April and May, German U-boats sank three Brazilian steamships. On 9 April, Brazil terminated diplomatic relations with Germany; placed armed guards on German ships in Brazilian ports; and removed "essential machinery". On 2 June, Brazil seized 46 German merchant ships that were sheltering in Brazilian ports. They included four Asuncion-class ships: Asuncion in Belém; and San Nicolas; Santos and Tijuca in Pernambuco.

Asuncion was renamed Campos. By 1920 she was registered in Rio de Janeiro. On 16 June 1920; she struck rocks in Victoria Girazill Bay; and was beached at Rio de Janeiro to save her from sinking. Lloyd Brasileiro was managing her by 1923, and owned her by 1927. The company operated her on cabotage routes along the Brazilian coast. By 1934, her call sign was PUAP, and this had superseded her code letters.

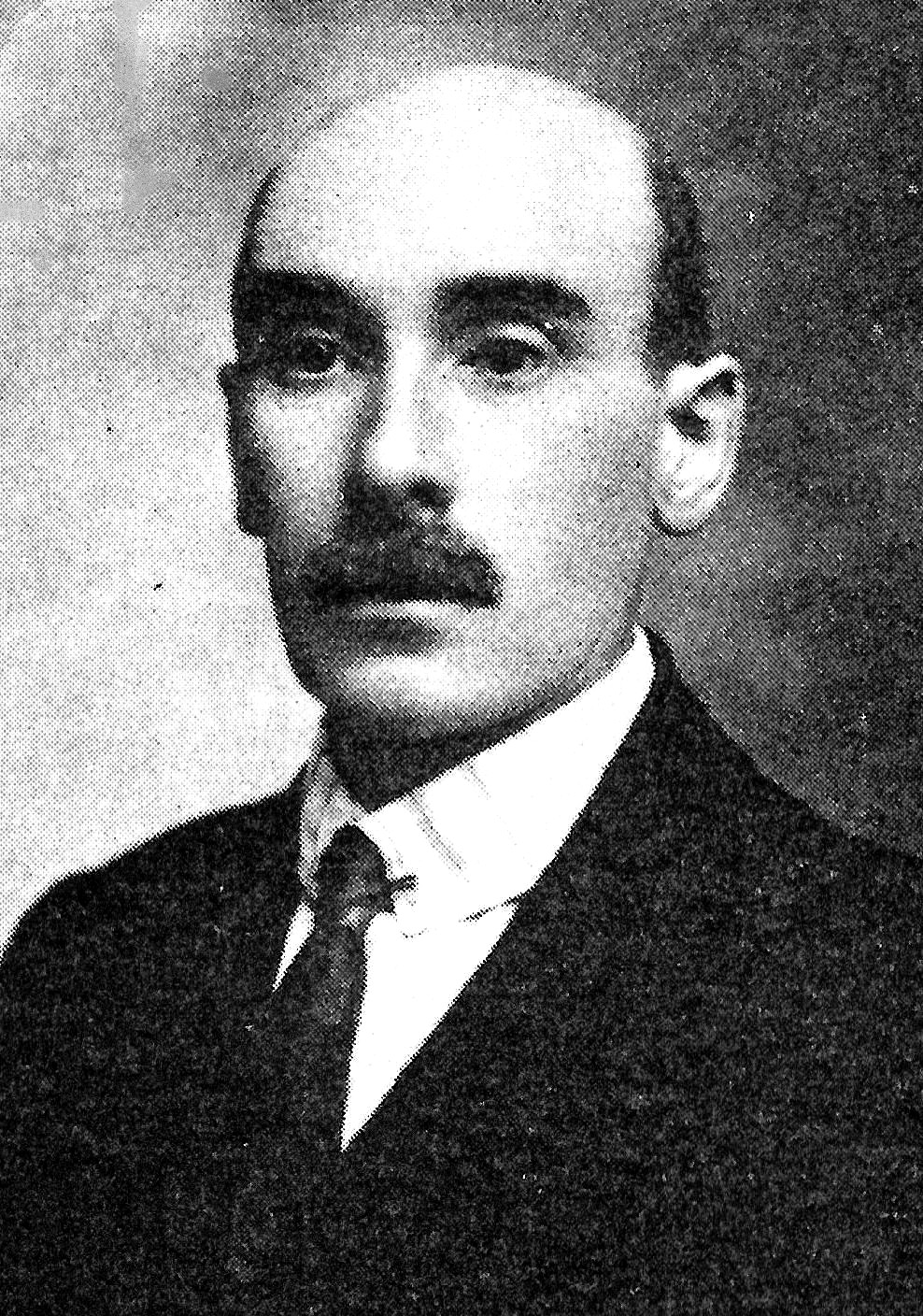
Everardo Dias

During the São Paulo Revolt of 1924, the Brazilian Navy requisitioned ships including Campos, and used them as prison ships in Guanabara Bay. Campos held about 800 tenentist prisoners, including workers, sailors, soldiers, and non-commissioned officers.

The political prisoner Everardo Dias condemned conditions aboard her as the worst of the Brazilian prison ships. Prisoners worked ten hours a day: chipping rust off her steelwork; cleaning her decks, machinery, and boilers; unravelling ropes; and doing laundry. They wore the same clothes for months on end; and slept on the iron decks below her main deck. Their diet was a cup of coffee and bread in the morning, a ladle of beans with flour for lunch, and another for dinner.

== Second World War ==
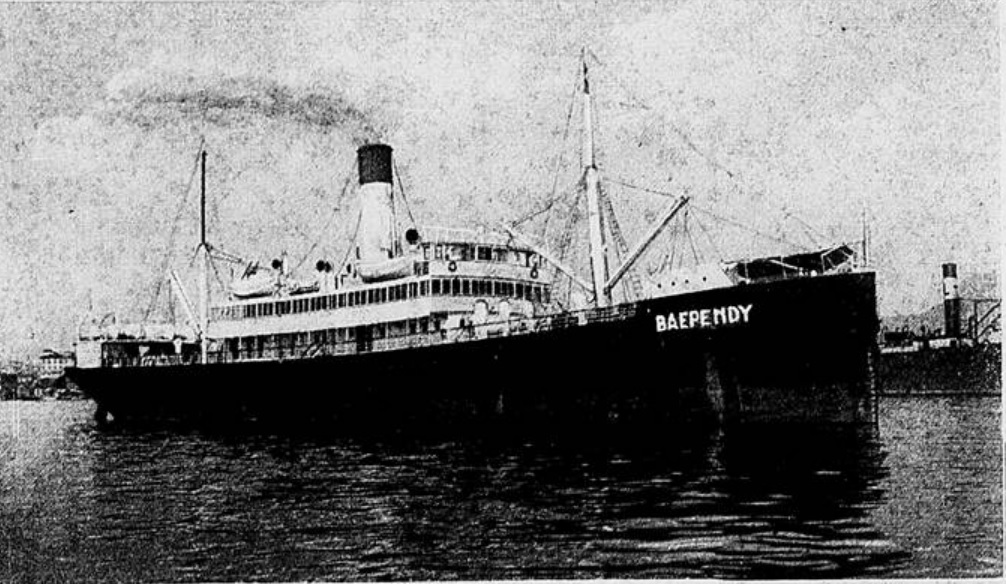
The Asuncion-class ship Baependy, formerly Hamburg Süd's Tijuca

In the early part of the Second World War, Brazil was again neutral. However, from February 1942 onward, German U-boats sank a number of Brazilian merchant ships. On 15 August, a U-boat sank the Brazilian ship Baependy, killing 270 people. (Baependy was the former Tijuca, one of Campos' sister ships.) Brazilians were outraged, and on 22 August the country declared war against Germany and its allies.

German attacks on Brazilian ships continued. In October 1943, Campos was under way in ballast from Rio de Janeiro to Rio Grande do Sul. Her Master was Captain Mário Amaral Gama. She carried 56 other officers and men, and six passengers. On the morning of 23 October, U-170 sighted her at about 06:00 hrs local time. This was 10:00 hrs Central European Time, which was the time that the Kriegsmarine used. The U-boat fired a spread of two torpedoes at Campos at 08:03 hrs (12:03 hrs CET); but both missed. At 08:09 hrs (12:09 hrs CET), about 5 nautical miles (9 km) south of Alcatrazes Islands, U-170 fired a third torpedo, which hit Campos' starboard bow.

Campos' crew and passengers launched four of her lifeboats to abandon ship. However, the crew did not shut down her engine; so she remained under way; and turned in circles. As she did so; her screw struck and smashed two of the lifeboats; killing seven men. At 12:33 hrs, U-170 torpedoed her again, hitting her port side just forward of her bridge. This sank her at position 25°07′S 45°40′W.

A total of ten crew members and two passengers were killed. 51 survivors in the remaining two boats headed for land. One boat reached Santos, and the other landed at Ilhabela.

== Bibliography ==
- Aragão, Isabel Lopez (2011). Da caserna ao cárcere – uma identidade militar-rebelde construída na adversidade, nas prisões (1922-1930) (PDF). Programa de Pós-Graduação em História da Universidade (Thesis) (in Portuguese). Rio de Janeiro: Estado do Rio de Janeiro.
- Cooper, James; Kludas, Arnold; Pein, Joachim (1989). The Hamburg South America Line. Kendal: World Ship Society. ISBN 0-905617-50-9.
- Heaton, Paul M (2004). Lamport & Holt Line. Abergavenny: PM Heaton Publishing. ISBN 1-872006-16-7.
- Herbert, Carl (1934). Kriegsfahrten Deutscher Handelsschiffe (in German). Hamburg: Broschek.
- Lloyd's Register of British and Foreign Shipping. Vol. I.–Steamers. London: Lloyd's Register of Shipping. 1896 – via Internet Archive.
- Lloyd's Register of Shipping. Vol. I.–Steamers. London: Lloyd's Register of Shipping. 1914 – via Internet Archive.
- Lloyd's Register of Shipping. Vol. II.–Steamers. London: Lloyd's Register of Shipping. 1917 – via Internet Archive.
- Lloyd's Register of Shipping. Vol. II.–Steamers. London: Lloyd's Register of Shipping. 1920 – via Internet Archive.
- Lloyd's Register of Shipping. Vol. II.–Steamers and Motor Vessels. London: Lloyd's Register of Shipping. 1923 – via Internet Archive.
- Lloyd's Register of Shipping. Vol. II.–Steamers and Motorships. London: Lloyd's Register of Shipping. 1927 – via Internet Archive.
- Lloyd's Register of Shipping (PDF). Vol. II.–Steamers and Motorships of 300 tons gross and over. London: Lloyd's Register of Shipping. 1934 – via Southampton City Council.
- The Marconi Press Agency Ltd (1914). The Year Book of Wireless Telegraphy and Telephony. London: The Marconi Press Agency Ltd.
- Meirelles, Domingos João (2002). As noites das grandes fogueiras: uma história da Coluna Prestes (in Portuguese) (9 ed.). Rio de Janeiro: Record.
