= German submarine U-200 =

German World War II submarine

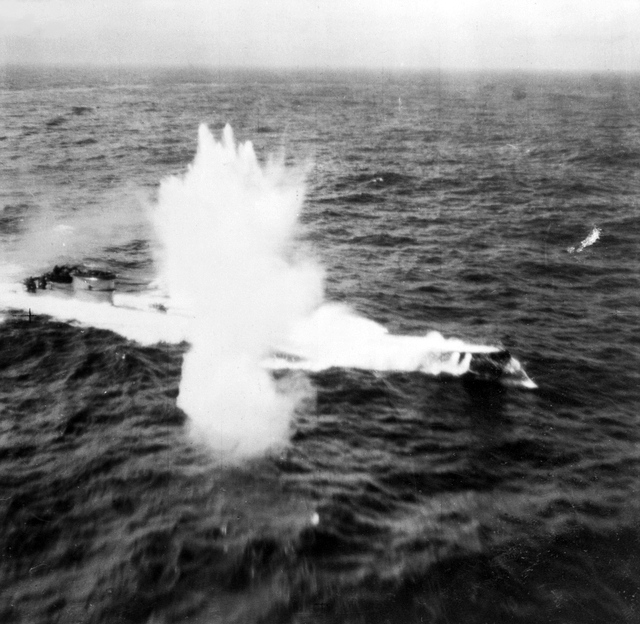
- U-200 under attack on 24 June 1943 southwest of Iceland

History

Nazi Germany
- Name: U-200
- Ordered: 4 November 1940
- Builder: AG Weser, Bremen
- Yard number: 1046
- Laid down: 3 November 1941
- Launched: 10 August 1942
- Commissioned: 22 December 1942
- Fate: Sunk, 24 June 1943 by a British aircraft southwest of Iceland

General characteristics
- Class & type: Type IXD2 submarine
- Displacement: 1,616 t (1,590 long tons) surfaced; 1,804 t (1,776 long tons) submerged
- Length: 87.60 m (287 ft 5 in) o/a; 68.50 m (224 ft 9 in) pressure hull
- Beam: 7.50 m (24 ft 7 in) o/a; 4.40 m (14 ft 5 in) pressure hull
- Height: 10.20 m (33 ft 6 in)
- Draught: 5.40 m (17 ft 9 in)
- Installed power: 9,000 PS (6,620 kW; 8,880 bhp) (diesels); 1,000 PS (740 kW; 990 shp) (electric)
- Propulsion: 2 shafts; 2 × diesel engines; 2 × electric motors
- Speed: 20.8 knots (38.5 km/h; 23.9 mph) surfaced; 6.9 knots (12.8 km/h; 7.9 mph) submerged
- Range: 12,750 nmi (23,610 km; 14,670 mi) at 10 knots (19 km/h; 12 mph) surfaced; 57 nmi (106 km; 66 mi) at 4 knots (7.4 km/h; 4.6 mph) submerged
- Test depth: Calculated crush depth: 230 m (754 ft 7 in)
- Complement: 55 - 64
- Armament: 6 × torpedo tubes (four bow, two stern); 24 × 53.3 cm (21 in) torpedoes; 1 × 10.5 cm (4.1 in) SK C/32 deck gun (150 rounds); 1 × 3.7 cm (1.5 in) SK C/30; 1 × 2 cm (0.79 in) C/30 anti-aircraft guns

Service record
- Part of: 4th U-boat Flotilla; 22 December 1942 – 31 May 1943; 12th U-boat Flotilla; 1 – 24 June 1943
- Identification codes: M 49 039
- Commanders: K.Kapt. Heinrich Schonder; 22 December 1942 – 24 June 1943
- Operations: 1 patrol: 12 – 24 June 1943
- Victories: None

German submarine U-200 was a Type IXD2 U-boat of Nazi Germany's Kriegsmarine during World War II.

The submarine was laid down on 3 November 1941 at the AG Weser yard at Bremen as yard number 1046, launched on 10 August 1942 and commissioned on 22 December 1942 under the command of Korvettenkapitän Heinrich Schonder. After training with the 4th U-boat Flotilla at Stettin, the boat was transferred to the 12th U-boat Flotilla for front-line service from 1 June 1943.

She was sunk south-west of Iceland by depth charges from a British aircraft.

== Design ==
German Type IXD2 submarines were considerably larger than the original Type IXs. U-200 had a displacement of 1,610 tonnes (1,580 long tons) when at the surface and 1,799 tonnes (1,771 long tons) while submerged. The U-boat had a total length of 87.58 m (287 ft 4 in), a pressure hull length of 68.50 m (224 ft 9 in), a beam of 7.50 m (24 ft 7 in), a height of 10.20 m (33 ft 6 in), and a draught of 5.35 m (17 ft 7 in). The submarine was powered by two MAN M 9 V 40/46 supercharged four-stroke, nine-cylinder diesel engines plus two MWM RS34.5S six-cylinder four-stroke diesel engines for cruising, producing a total of 9,000 metric horsepower (6,620 kW; 8,880 shp) for use while surfaced, two Siemens-Schuckert 2 GU 345/34 double-acting electric motors producing a total of 1,000 shaft horsepower (1,010 PS; 750 kW) for use while submerged. She had two shafts and two 1.85 m (6 ft) propellers. The boat was capable of operating at depths of up to 200 metres (660 ft).

The submarine had a maximum surface speed of 20.8 knots (38.5 km/h; 23.9 mph) and a maximum submerged speed of 6.9 knots (12.8 km/h; 7.9 mph). When submerged, the boat could operate for 121 nautical miles (224 km; 139 mi) at 2 knots (3.7 km/h; 2.3 mph); when surfaced, she could travel 12,750 nautical miles (23,610 km; 14,670 mi) at 10 knots (19 km/h; 12 mph). U-200 was fitted with six 53.3 cm (21 in) torpedo tubes (four fitted at the bow and two at the stern), 24 torpedoes, one 10.5 cm (4.13 in) SK C/32 naval gun, 150 rounds, and a 3.7 cm (1.5 in) SK C/30 with 2575 rounds as well as one 2 cm (0.79 in) C/30 anti-aircraft gun with 8100 rounds. The boat had a complement of fifty-five.

== Service history ==
U-200's first and only operational war patrol began on 12 June 1943. The new submarine departed Kiel and sailed north of the British Isles, through the gap between Iceland and the Faroe Islands and into the Atlantic Ocean. On 24 June 1943 the U-boat was located by the RAF and sunk with all hands in position 58°15′N 25°25′W by depth charges from a British Consolidated B-24 Liberator of 120 Squadron. This was initially reported to be an attack on U-194 which was sunk on the same day, but that submarine was sunk by aircraft of a different unit.

All 68 souls aboard U-200, including seven members of the German 'Brandenburg' special forces, were lost.

== Bibliography ==
- Busch, Rainer; Röll, Hans-Joachim (1999). German U-boat commanders of World War II : a biographical dictionary. Translated by Brooks, Geoffrey. London, Annapolis, Md: Greenhill Books, Naval Institute Press. ISBN 1-55750-186-6.
- Busch, Rainer; Röll, Hans-Joachim (1999). Deutsche U-Boot-Verluste von September 1939 bis Mai 1945 [German U-boat losses from September 1939 to May 1945]. Der U-Boot-Krieg (in German). Vol. IV. Hamburg, Berlin, Bonn: Mittler. ISBN 3-8132-0514-2.
- Gröner, Erich; Jung, Dieter; Maass, Martin (1991). U-boats and Mine Warfare Vessels. German Warships 1815–1945. Vol. 2. Translated by Thomas, Keith; Magowan, Rachel. London: Conway Maritime Press. ISBN 0-85177-593-4.
