= 10th U-boat Flotilla =

- The 10th Flotilla emblem
- Active: 15 January 1942 – 21 October 1944
- Country: Nazi Germany
- Branch: Kriegsmarine
- Type: U-boat
- Garrison/HQ: Lorient, France
- Engagements: World War II; Battle of the Atlantic (1939-1945); Battle of the Caribbean

Commanders
- Notable commanders: Korvettenkapitän Günther Kuhnke

The 10th U-boat Flotilla (German 10. Unterseebootsflottille) was a German U-boat flotilla used for front-line combat purposes during World War II. Founded on 15 January 1942 at Lorient under the command of Korvettenkapitän Günther Kuhnke, eighty U-boats, including two captured Dutch submarines, operated with this flotilla before it was dissolved on 21 August 1944, and the remaining U-boats were moved to bases in Norway and Germany. Kuhnke himself took command of U-853, the last U-boat to leave, on 27 August 1944 to sail to Flensburg where he assumed command of 33rd U-boat Flotilla.

== U-boats assigned ==
- U-118
- U-155
- U-158
- U-159
- U-160
- U-163
- U-164
- U-165
- U-166
- U-167
- U-169
- U-170
- U-171
- U-172
- U-174
- U-175
- U-176
- U-177
- U-178
- U-179
- U-181
- U-185
- U-186
- U-187
- U-188
- U-192
- U-193
- U-194
- U-459
- U-460
- U-461
- U-462
- U-463
- U-464
- U-506
- U-508
- U-509
- U-510
- U-511
- U-512
- U-513
- U-514
- U-515
- U-516
- U-517
- U-523
- U-524
- U-525
- U-526
- U-527
- U-528
- U-529
- U-530
- U-533
- U-535
- U-537
- U-539
- U-540
- U-541
- U-542
- U-543
- U-544
- U-546
- U-549
- U-550
- U-804
- U-844
- U-845
- U-846
- U-853
- U-855
- U-857
- U-865
- U-866
- U-1221
- U-1222
- U-1229
- U-1230

and UD-3 and UD-5, two captured Dutch submarines that were operated by the Germans during the time.
