= German submarine U-846 =

German World War II submarine

History

Nazi Germany
- Name: U-846
- Ordered: 20 January 1941
- Builder: DeSchiMAG AG Weser, Bremen
- Yard number: 1052
- Laid down: 21 July 1942
- Launched: 17 February 1943
- Commissioned: 29 May 1943
- Fate: Sunk by aircraft in position 46°4′N 9°20′W on 4 May 1944

General characteristics
- Class & type: Type IXC/40 submarine
- Displacement: 1,144 t (1,126 long tons) surfaced; 1,257 t (1,237 long tons) submerged
- Length: 76.76 m (251 ft 10 in) o/a; 58.75 m (192 ft 9 in) pressure hull
- Beam: 6.86 m (22 ft 6 in) o/a; 4.44 m (14 ft 7 in) pressure hull
- Height: 9.60 m (31 ft 6 in)
- Draught: 4.67 m (15 ft 4 in)
- Installed power: 4,400 PS (3,200 kW; 4,300 bhp) (diesels); 1,000 PS (740 kW; 990 shp) (electric)
- Propulsion: 2 shafts; 2 × diesel engines; 2 × electric motors
- Speed: 19 knots (35 km/h; 22 mph) surfaced; 7.3 knots (13.5 km/h; 8.4 mph) submerged
- Range: 13,850 nmi (25,650 km; 15,940 mi) at 10 knots (19 km/h; 12 mph) surfaced; 63 nmi (117 km; 72 mi) at 4 knots (7.4 km/h; 4.6 mph) submerged
- Test depth: 230 m (750 ft)
- Complement: 4 officers, 44 enlisted
- Armament: 6 × torpedo tubes (4 bow, 2 stern); 22 × 53.3 cm (21 in) torpedoes; 1 × 10.5 cm (4.1 in) SK C/32 deck gun (180 rounds); 1 × 3.7 cm (1.5 in) SK C/30 AA gun; 1 × twin 2 cm FlaK 30 AA guns

Service record
- Part of: 4th U-boat Flotilla; 29 May – 30 November 1943; 10th U-boat Flotilla; 1 December 1943 – 4 May 1944
- Identification codes: M 51 907
- Commanders: Oblt.z.S.d.R. Berthold Hashagen; 29 May 1943 – 4 May 1944
- Operations: 2 patrols: 1st patrol: 4 December 1943 – 3 March 1944; 2nd patrol: 29 April – 4 May 1944
- Victories: None

German submarine U-846 was a Type IXC/40 U-boat built for Nazi Germany's Kriegsmarine during World War II.

== Design ==
German Type IXC/40 submarines were slightly larger than the original Type IXCs. U-846 had a displacement of 1,144 tonnes (1,126 long tons) when at the surface and 1,257 tonnes (1,237 long tons) while submerged. The U-boat had a total length of 76.76 m (251 ft 10 in), a pressure hull length of 58.75 m (192 ft 9 in), a beam of 6.86 m (22 ft 6 in), a height of 9.60 m (31 ft 6 in), and a draught of 4.67 m (15 ft 4 in). The submarine was powered by two MAN M 9 V 40/46 supercharged four-stroke, nine-cylinder diesel engines producing a total of 4,400 metric horsepower (3,240 kW; 4,340 shp) for use while surfaced, two Siemens-Schuckert 2 GU 345/34 double-acting electric motors producing a total of 1,000 shaft horsepower (1,010 PS; 750 kW) for use while submerged. She had two shafts and two 1.92 m (6 ft) propellers. The boat was capable of operating at depths of up to 230 metres (750 ft).

The submarine had a maximum surface speed of 18.3 knots (33.9 km/h; 21.1 mph) and a maximum submerged speed of 7.3 knots (13.5 km/h; 8.4 mph). When submerged, the boat could operate for 63 nautical miles (117 km; 72 mi) at 4 knots (7.4 km/h; 4.6 mph); when surfaced, she could travel 13,850 nautical miles (25,650 km; 15,940 mi) at 10 knots (19 km/h; 12 mph). U-846 was fitted with six 53.3 cm (21 in) torpedo tubes (four fitted at the bow and two at the stern), 22 torpedoes, one 10.5 cm (4.13 in) SK C/32 naval gun, 180 rounds, and a 3.7 cm (1.5 in) SK C/30 as well as a 2 cm (0.79 in) C/30 anti-aircraft gun. The boat had a complement of forty-eight.

== Service history ==
U-846 was ordered on 20 January 1941 from DeSchiMAG AG Weser in Bremen under the yard number 1052. Her keel was laid down on 21 July 1942. The U-boat was launched the following year on 17 February 1943. On 29 May she was commissioned into service under the command of Oberleutnant zur See der Reserve Berthold Hashagen (Crew 37) in 4th U-boat Flotilla.

After completing training, U-846 was transferred to 10th U-boat Flotilla and left Kiel for the North Atlantic on 4 December 1943. Joining groups Amrum and Rügen at the end of the month, returning without success to Lorient on 3 March 1944. U-846 left Lorient again on 29 April. During an air attack on 2 May she managed to shoot down one aircraft, Halifax 'H' of No. 58 Squadron RAF. The next day another aircraft attacked the U-boat without success, but early on 4 May a bomb hit from a Wellington, 'M' of 407 Squadron RCAF, sank U-846 in position 46°6′N 9°20′W.

== Bibliography ==
- Busch, Rainer; Röll, Hans-Joachim (1999). German U-boat commanders of World War II: a biographical dictionary. Translated by Brooks, Geoffrey. London, Annapolis, Md: Greenhill Books, Naval Institute Press. ISBN 1-55750-186-6.
- Busch, Rainer; Röll, Hans-Joachim (1999). Der U-Boot-Krieg, 1939-1945: Deutsche U-Boot-Verluste von September 1939 bis Mai 1945 [German U-boat losses from September 1939 to May 1945] (in German). Vol. IV. Hamburg, Berlin, Bonn: Mittler. ISBN 3-8132-0514-2.
- Gröner, Eric; Jung, Dieter; Maass, Martin (1991). German Warships 1815-1945: U-boats and Mine Warfare Vessels. Vol. 2. Translated by Thomas, Keith; Magowan, Rachel. London: Conway Maritime Press. ISBN 0-85177-593-4.
