= German submarine U-170 =

German World War II submarine

History

Nazi Germany
- Name: U-170
- Ordered: 15 August 1940
- Builder: DeSchiMAG, Bremen
- Yard number: 709
- Laid down: 21 May 1941
- Launched: 6 June 1942
- Commissioned: 19 January 1943
- Fate: Surrendered on 9 May 1945; Scuttled on 30 November 1945 during Operation Deadlight

General characteristics
- Class & type: Type IXC/40 submarine
- Displacement: 1,144 t (1,126 long tons) surfaced; 1,257 t (1,237 long tons) submerged
- Length: 76.76 m (251 ft 10 in) o/a; 58.75 m (192 ft 9 in) pressure hull
- Beam: 6.86 m (22 ft 6 in) o/a; 4.44 m (14 ft 7 in) pressure hull
- Height: 9.60 m (31 ft 6 in)
- Draught: 4.67 m (15 ft 4 in)
- Installed power: 4,400 PS (3,200 kW; 4,300 bhp) (diesels); 1,000 PS (740 kW; 990 shp) (electric)
- Propulsion: 2 shafts; 2 × diesel engines; 2 × electric motors
- Speed: 19 knots (35 km/h; 22 mph) surfaced; 7.3 knots (13.5 km/h; 8.4 mph) submerged
- Range: 13,850 nmi (25,650 km; 15,940 mi) at 10 knots (19 km/h; 12 mph) surfaced; 63 nmi (117 km; 72 mi) at 4 knots (7.4 km/h; 4.6 mph) submerged
- Complement: 4 officers, 44 enlisted
- Armament: 6 × torpedo tubes (4 bow, 2 stern); 22 × 53.3 cm (21 in) torpedoes; 1 × 10.5 cm (4.1 in) SK C/32 deck gun (180 rounds); 1 × 3.7 cm (1.5 in) SK C/30 AA gun; 1 × twin 2 cm FlaK 30 AA guns

Service record
- Part of: 4th U-boat Flotilla; 19 January 1943 – 31 May 1943; 10th U-boat Flotilla; 1 June 1943 – 31 October 1944; 33rd U-boat Flotilla; 1 November 1944 – 8 May 1945
- Commanders: Kptlt. Gunther Pfeffer; 19 January 1943 – July 1944; Oblt.z.S. Hans-Gerold Hauber; July 1944 – 9 May 1945
- Operations: 4 patrols: 1st patrol: 27 May – 9 July 1943; 2nd patrol: 29 August – 23 December 1943; 3rd patrol: 9 February – 27 May 1944; 4th patrol: 1 August – 4 December 1944
- Victories: 1 merchant ship sunk (4,663 GRT)

German submarine U-170 was a Type IXC/40 U-boat of Nazi Germany's Kriegsmarine built for service during World War II. Her keel was laid down on 21 May 1941 by the Deutsche Schiff- und Maschinenbau AG in Bremen as yard number 709. She was launched on 6 June 1942 and commissioned on 19 January 1943 with Kapitänleutnant Günther Pfeffer in command.

The U-boat's service began with training as part of the 4th U-boat Flotilla. She then moved to the 10th flotilla on 1 June 1943 for operations. She was reassigned to the 33rd flotilla on 1 November 1944.

== Design ==
German Type IXC/40 submarines were slightly larger than the original Type IXCs. U-170 had a displacement of 1,144 tonnes (1,126 long tons) when at the surface and 1,257 tonnes (1,237 long tons) while submerged. The U-boat had a total length of 76.76 m (251 ft 10 in), a pressure hull length of 58.75 m (192 ft 9 in), a beam of 6.86 m (22 ft 6 in), a height of 9.60 m (31 ft 6 in), and a draught of 4.67 m (15 ft 4 in). The submarine was powered by two MAN M 9 V 40/46 supercharged four-stroke, nine-cylinder diesel engines producing a total of 4,400 metric horsepower (3,240 kW; 4,340 shp) for use while surfaced, two Siemens-Schuckert 2 GU 345/34 double-acting electric motors producing a total of 1,000 metric horsepower (740 kW; 990 shp) for use while submerged. She had two shafts and two 1.92 m (6 ft) propellers. The boat was capable of operating at depths of up to 230 metres (750 ft).

The submarine had a maximum surface speed of 18.3 knots (33.9 km/h; 21.1 mph) and a maximum submerged speed of 7.3 knots (13.5 km/h; 8.4 mph). When submerged, the boat could operate for 63 nautical miles (117 km; 72 mi) at 4 knots (7.4 km/h; 4.6 mph); when surfaced, she could travel 13,850 nautical miles (25,650 km; 15,940 mi) at 10 knots (19 km/h; 12 mph). U-170 was fitted with six 53.3 cm (21 in) torpedo tubes (four fitted at the bow and two at the stern), 22 torpedoes, one 10.5 cm (4.13 in) SK C/32 naval gun, 180 rounds, and a 3.7 cm (1.5 in) SK C/30 as well as a 2 cm (0.79 in) C/30 anti-aircraft gun. The boat had a complement of forty-eight.

== Service history ==
=== First patrol ===
U-170's first patrol began with her departure from Kiel on 27 May 1943. Her route took her the long way around the British Isles to the Atlantic Ocean west of the Azores. She had passed through the 'gap' between Iceland and the Faroe Islands. She arrived at Lorient in occupied France on 9 July.

=== Second patrol ===
Her second sortie was to the Brazilian coast. Here she sank the Campos (4,663 GRT) on 23 October 1943, 5 nautical miles (9.3 km; 5.8 mi) south of Alcatrazes Islands.

=== Third patrol ===
The boat's third foray was to the US east coast. She departed Lorient on 9 February 1944 and returned to the same port on 27 May.

=== Fourth patrol ===
Her last patrol was to the waters off West Africa. On the return voyage to Germany, she was attacked by unidentified destroyers west of southern Ireland on 30 October 1944 and was badly damaged. She also reported a damaged Schnorchel (underwater breathing device), on 5 November and docked in Norway for repairs. She arrived at Flensburg on 4 December.

=== Fate ===
U-170 surrendered in Horten Naval Base, Norway on 9 May 1945, and was transferred to Loch Ryan in Scotland. She was scuttled on 30 November 1945 as part of Operation Deadlight.

== Summary of raiding history ==
Date	Name	Nationality	Tonnage (GRT)	Fate
23 October 1943	Campos	Brazil	4,663	Sunk

== Bibliography ==
- Busch, Rainer; Röll, Hans-Joachim (1999). German U-boat commanders of World War II: a biographical dictionary. Translated by Brooks, Geoffrey. London, Annapolis, MD: Greenhill Books, Naval Institute Press. ISBN 1-55750-186-6.
- Busch, Rainer; Röll, Hans-Joachim (1999). Deutsche U-Boot-Verluste von September 1939 bis Mai 1945 [German U-boat losses from September 1939 to May 1945]. Der U-Boot-Krieg (in German). Vol. IV. Hamburg, Berlin, Bonn: Mittler. ISBN 3-8132-0514-2.
- Gröner, Erich; Jung, Dieter; Maass, Martin (1991). U-boats and Mine Warfare Vessels. German Warships 1815–1945. Vol. 2. Translated by Thomas, Keith; Magowan, Rachel. London: Conway Maritime Press. ISBN 0-85177-593-4.
