= Type IX submarine =

German type of large ocean-going submarines

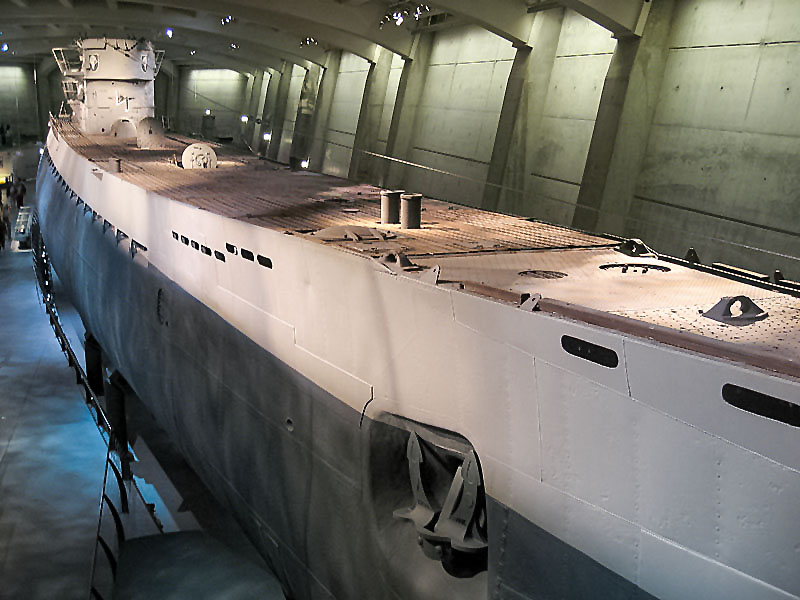
- U-505, a type IXC U-boat

Class overview
- Name: Type IX
- Operators: Kriegsmarine; Imperial Japanese Navy; Soviet Navy; French Navy; Royal Canadian Navy
- Preceded by: Type I
- Succeeded by: Type XXI
- Subclasses: Type IXA; Type IXB; Type IXC; Type IXC/40; Type IXD1; Type IXD2; Type IXD/42
- Built: 1937–1945
- Planned: 290
- Building: 200
- Completed: 194
- Canceled: 90
- Preserved: 2

General characteristics Type IXC
- Propulsion: 2 × MAN M 9 V 40/46 supercharged 9-cylinder diesel engines, 4,400 PS (4,300 shp; 3,200 kW) (surfaced); 2 × SSW 1 GU 345/34 double-acting electric motors, 1,000 PS (990 shp; 740 kW) (submerged)
- Speed: 33.7 km/h (18.2 kn) (surfaced); 14.3 km/h (7.7 kn) (submerged)
- Range: 13,450 nmi (24,910 km; 15,480 mi) at 10 knots (19 km/h; 12 mph) surfaced; 63 nmi (117 km; 72 mi) at 4 knots (7.4 km/h; 4.6 mph) submerged
- Test depth: 230 m (750 ft)
- Complement: 48
- Armament: 6 × torpedo tubes (4 bow, 2 stern); 22 × 53.3 cm (21 in) torpedoes; Until 1943; 1 × 10.5 cm (4.1 in) C/32; 1 × 3.7 cm (1.5 in) C/30; 1 × 2 cm (0.79 in) C/30; After 1943: Deck gun removed, various anti-aircraft weaponry

The Type IX U-boat is a class of large U-boats built for Nazi Germany's Kriegsmarine from 1936 to 1945. Derived from the preceding Type I class, it was designed as a large ocean-going submarine for sustained operations far from the home support facilities. (Note: Showell states that the Type IX submarine was designed as a further development of the U-81.) It appeared in various sub-types: the first four subtypes IXA, IXB and IXC and IXC/40 differed only by an ever widened and lengthened outer hull to increase fuel storage and range. The Type IXD also had an enlarged outer hull, but also a lengthened pressure hull to allow for the installation of additional engines. The Type IXD came in three versions: the type IXD1 used its larger engine room to install more diesel power for higher top speed; the nearly identical types IXD2 and IXD/42 used the extra engine space to install economical cruising engines, extending their range to three times that of the original type IXA design.

A total of 194 Type IX U-boats were commissioned in the German Navy between 1938 and 1945. During World War II, they mounted patrols in individual long-range submarine operations to the West African coast, the East Coast of the United States, the South Atlantic Ocean, and as far as the Indian Ocean. They also took part in wolfpack attacks against North-Atlantic convoys. At the end of the war, most of the remaining boats were scuttled, either by their crews in Operation Regenbogen or later by the British in Operation Deadlight. A few survivors served in foreign navies. Two Type IX are preserved: U-505 was captured at sea and survives at the Museum of Science and Industry in Chicago and U-534 was sunk on 5 May 1945, but raised and is on display at Woodside Ferry Terminal, Birkenhead.

== Design ==
The Anglo-German Naval Agreement of 1935 allowed Germany to build a U-Boat fleet of 22,050 t (21,700 long tons). Parts for two Type I, twenty-four Type II and ten Type VII U-boats had already been produced before the conclusion of the agreement and these thirty-six U-boats comprising 12,500 t (12,300 long tons) were built within the year. The German Navy wanted to spend the remaining 9,950 t (9,790 long tons) on a large 750 t (740 long tons) U-boat, capable of operating in the Mediterranean Sea.

In order to speed up construction, the existing Type I design was modified to fulfill the extra requirements. To improve speed, the eight-cylinder diesel engine was replaced with a more powerful nine-cylinder supercharged diesel engine, and the forward section was more streamlined. To increase torpedo capacity, the upper deck was widened, providing space to store ten spare torpedoes below deck in water-tight containers. Because the heavier diesel engines required a larger engine room, the crew quarters and all battery compartments were moved forward of the control room. The pressure hull diameter was increased by 12 cm (4.7 in). The double hull contained all ballast tanks and part of the fuel. The double hull with the wide and flat deck and bulwarks perpendicular to the surface, made the boat very seaworthy on the surface but affected the diving time badly. Diving time increased to 35 seconds, compared to 25−30 seconds for a Type VII. Constructional, test and crush diving depth were 100 m (328 ft 1 in), 150 m (492 ft 2 in) and 250 m (820 ft 3 in) respectively. (Note: German U-boat construction used a safety factor of 2.5, which meant that crush diving depth was 2.5 times construction diving depth. Test diving depth used a safety factor of 1.5.)

=== Armament ===
Type IXs had six torpedo tubes; four at the bow and two at the stern. They carried six torpedoes in the tubes, six reloads internally and ten spare torpedoes externally in pressure-tight containers. There were torpedo hatches fore and aft through which torpedoes could be reloaded at harbour, but it was also possible to take on these external spares at sea through these two hatches, by mounting a collapsible trough and a tripod. When during a patrol a spare torpedo was transferred from the external container to the inner torpedo room, the torpedo hatch had to be opened and the U-boat was unable to dive in that state. Hence this could only be done in low-risk areas.

At the start of the U-boat building program in 1935, the Germans were only allowed to build a limited number of U-boats and they could not afford to build specialized minelaying U-boats. Instead they developed sea mines that could be laid by any U-boat through the torpedo tubes. A TMA moored mine could be laid in waters with a depth of maximum 270 m (890 ft) and had a length of 3.64 m (11 ft 11 in). Each torpedo could be substituted by two TMA mines. The TMB ground mine had a length of 2.31 m (7 ft 7 in) so that for each torpedo, three TMB's could be loaded. In November 1939 a heavier TMC ground mine with a length of 3.39 m (11 ft 1 in) came into service. A Type IX could carry either 44 TMA, 60 TMB, or 22 TMC mines.

Type IXs had a standard gun armament consisting of one 10.5 cm (4.1 in) deck gun mounted before the conning tower, one 3.7 cm SK C/30 mounted behind the conning tower and one 2 cm (0.79 in) C/30 mounted on a platform aft of the conning tower. From 1943 onwards, the deck gun was removed from most U-boats as it had little use anymore, except for U-boats operating in the Indian Ocean. At the same time the anti-aircraft defense was reinforced by substituting the lone 2 cm gun by two twin 2 cm guns on the higher platform behind the conning tower, whilst the 3.7 cm gun was moved to a lower platform behind the conning tower. In order to compensate for the extra volume caused by the installation of extra anti-aircraft guns, some of the U-boats had a part of their forward deck removed.

== Subclasses ==
=== Type IXA ===
The German Navy had intended to order thirteen Type IX, eight in 1936 and five in 1937, to be built by Deschimag AG Weser in Bremen and Germaniawerft in Kiel. Discussions about the exact role of the boats, and debates about whether to build more but smaller U-boats instead of fewer and larger ones, postponed these orders. Finally Erich Raeder ordered a first batch of four Type IX boats from Deschimag AG Weser on 29 July 1936. On 21 November a second batch of four boats was ordered from the same yard. These eight U-boats were commissioned between August 1938 and November 1939. Five were lost during the first year of the war, with another, U-43, sunk in August 1943. The two remaining boats, U-37 and U-38, were scuttled at the end of the war, having been moved in to a training role towards the end of 1941.

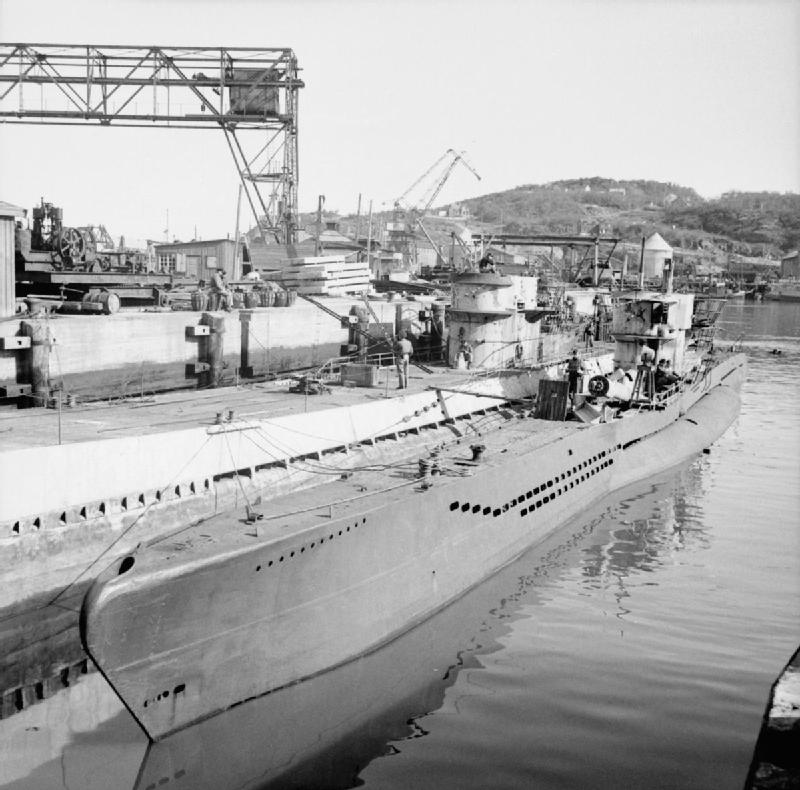
This picture distinguishes the larger Type IX in the background with its double hull and wide upper deck, from the smaller Type VII in the foreground with its saddle tanks.

=== Type IXB ===
On 17 July 1937 the British amended the Anglo-German Naval Agreement to allow for an expansion of their submarine fleet. As a consequence Germany was also allowed to increase its U-boat tonnage. Part of this allowance was used to order two Type IXB boats on 16 July. The Type IXB was nearly identical to the Type IXA, except for a wider outer hull, which increased fuel storage to 165 t (162 long tons), and the deck gun being mounted closer to the conning tower.

In 1938, Germany invoked a clause of the Anglo-German Naval Agreement which allowed them to build submarines in parity with the British. With the extra allowed tonnage, eight Type IXB boats were ordered on 24 May. A ninth was ordered on 8 August, followed by a further five. All fourteen Type IXB were ordered from DeSchiMAG AG Weser in Bremen. These boats were commissioned between December 1939 and December 1940. Thirteen of the boats were sunk during World War II. The remaining U-123 was scuttled at Lorient Submarine Base in August 1944 before the advancing Allied army.

=== Type IXC ===
The Type IXC had again a wider outer hull, with storage for an additional 43 tonnes of fuel, increasing the boat's range. This series kept the two conning tower periscopes but omitted the third control room periscope. The thirty-five boats of U-162 through U-170 and U-505 through U-550 were not fitted for mine operations.

The first ten Type IXC were ordered on 7 August 1939. Three shipyards, DeSchiMAG AG Weser and Seebeckwerft of Bremen, and Deutsche Werft of Hamburg built fifty-four Type IXC submarines, which were commissioned in 1941-42. Out of fifty-four commissioned Type IXC U-boats, forty-nine were lost during the war. When the Allies overran France in 1944, two unserviceable Type IXC in French ports which could not be evacuated to Germany, were also lost. One was given to Japan as a gift from Hitler, one surrendered at the end of the war, and U-505 was captured at sea and survives at the Museum of Science and Industry in Chicago.

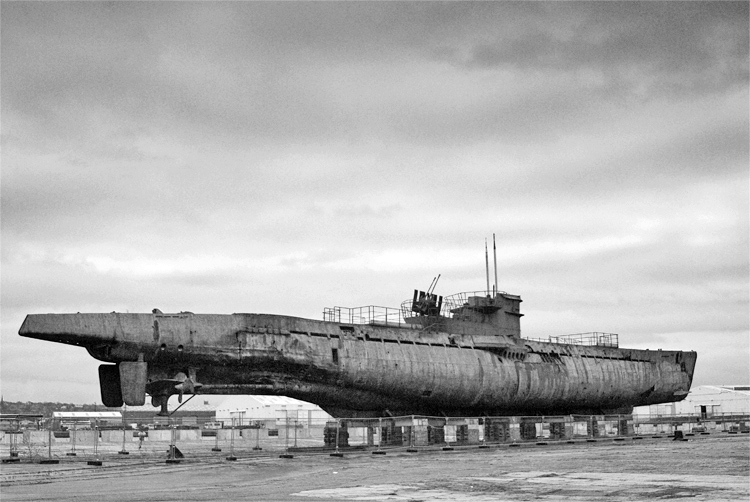
The salvaged U-534 at Birkenhead Docks, Merseyside, England.

=== Type IXC/40 ===
Type IXC/40 was an improved Type IXC with slightly increased range. The eighty-seven Type IXC/40 U-boats built at DeSchiMAG AG Weser and Seebeckwerft of Bremen, and Deutsche Werft of Hamburg were commissioned in 1942–1944. After the decision of Karl Dönitz on 13 August 1943 to focus on the construction of the new Elektroboote, on 30 September 1943, the outstanding order for seventy-one Type IXC/40 was cancelled. Sixty-four Type IXC/40 were lost in action, four were decommissioned before the end of the war, two were scuttled, one was transferred to the Japanese Navy and sixteen surrendered. The Type IXC/40 U-534 was sunk on 5 May 1945, but raised and is on display at Woodside Ferry Terminal, Birkenhead.

=== Type IXD1 ===
After the cancelling of the Type XI U-cruisers at the beginning of the war, which were intended for patrols against independently sailing vessels in remote areas, Dönitz sought a way to replace these U-cruisers with an existing design that could be modified without much impact on existing U-boat production. The solution was to adapt the Type IXC into two designs : a high-speed Type IXD1 and a long-range Type IXD2. On 28 May 1940 the first IXD U-boats were ordered. Only two Type IXD1 U-boats were built, U-180 was commissioned on 10 December 1941 and U-195 on 8 April 1942.

The Type IXD1 was significantly longer and heavier than the IXC/40. It had three pairs of 20-cylinder, four-stroke Daimler Benz MB501 diesels, which were also used for E-boats, with a total of 9,000 bhp (6,700 kW). This installation was not successful: it produced too much exhaust smoke, and the heat in the engine room was unbearable because of defective cooling. Since they were not fit for war patrols, it was decided in the autumn of 1943 to convert the two Type IXD1 U-boats into transport U-boats. They had their torpedo tubes removed and the six diesel engines were replaced with two Type VIIC 3,200 bhp (2,400 kW) Germaniawerft F46 diesel engines. As a consequence top speed dropped to 15.8 kn (29.3 km/h; 18.2 mph). In their new role they could transport 252 tonnes of cargo.

=== Type IXD2 and IXD/42 ===
Apart from the two standard MAN M9V40/46 diesel engine totalling 4,400 hp (3,300 kW; 4,500 PS), the Type IXD2 had two extra six-cylinder, four-stroke MWM RS34S diesel generators totalling 1,000 hp (750 kW; 1,000 PS) for economical cruising. The IXD2 had a range of 23,700 nautical miles (43,900 km; 27,300 mi) at 12 kn (22 km/h; 14 mph) and 31,500 nautical miles (58,300 km; 36,200 mi) at 10 kn (19 km/h; 12 mph). The IXD/42 was almost identical. Most of the Type IXD2 were sent to patrols in the Indian Ocean as part of the Monsun Gruppe and were equipped with a Focke-Achgelis Fa 330 rotor kite which was stored in two watertight vertical canisters behind the conning tower.

The first two Type IXD2 U-boats were ordered on 15 August 1940. DeSchiMAG AG Weser of Bremen built twenty-eight Type IXD2 U-boats, which were commissioned in 1942−1944. Following the decision by Dönitz to stop building conventional U-boats, the orders for twenty-two Type IXD/42 U-boats was cancelled. Only two that were already under construction by DeSchiMAG AG Weser of Bremen, were continued. U-883 was launched on 28 April 1944, commissioned 27 March 1945 and surrendered at the end of the war. The other Type IXD/42 U-884 was launched on 17 May 1944 but was badly damaged on 30 March 1945 by USAAF bombs while still in the dockyard and never commissioned.

== Operational history ==
On 1 September 1939 only seven Type IXA boats had been commissioned. Due to the lack of available U-boats during the early months of the war, most of boats were used for patrols in British waters and operations were only rarely mounted to the more distant waters of West Africa. Type IXB boats started to be commissioned in late 1939 and mounted their first patrols in April 1940; Type IXC boats began to be commissioned in 1941. Type IX U-boats were first put to long-range use when the United States entered the war in December 1941. During the Second Happy Time they mounted very successful operations to the East Coast of the United States and the Caribbean Sea. In October 1942 these U-boats started operations as far south as Cape Horn and ventured into the Indian Ocean. Eventually in 1943 a German base was established in Penang from where Type IXC and type IXD2 U-boatscould operate. Operating from that base, the Type IXD2 U-862 executed a unique patrol around Australia, reaching Tasmania and New Zealand, and was the only U-boat to sink a ship in the Pacific Ocean.

The Type IX was designed for long-range operations against independently sailing merchants, not for Wolfpack operations against convoys. But as not enough U-boats were available for operations against the Atlantic convoys, Type IXC U-boats often made a patrol on the North Atlantic convoy routes when transferring from their construction yards and training bases in Germany to their operational bases in German-occupied France. Due to their slow diving time, they were considered unfit for service in the Mediterranean Sea, and only Type VII boats were sent to that theatre of the war. For similar reasons they did not generally operate in the Arctic Ocean either.

Type IX U-boats sank two escort carriers and two cruisers, but most of their efforts were directed against merchant shipping: of the twenty-most successful U-boats, fourteen were Type IXs. The most successful patrol of the war was executed by Type IXB U-107, sinking fourteen ships for 86,699 GRT. The Type IXD2 U-196 made the longest patrol of the war, remaining at sea for 225 days. The most successful operations with Type IX U-boats include Operation Neuland, Wolfpack Eisbär and the first wave of Operation Drumbeat.

== In foreign service ==
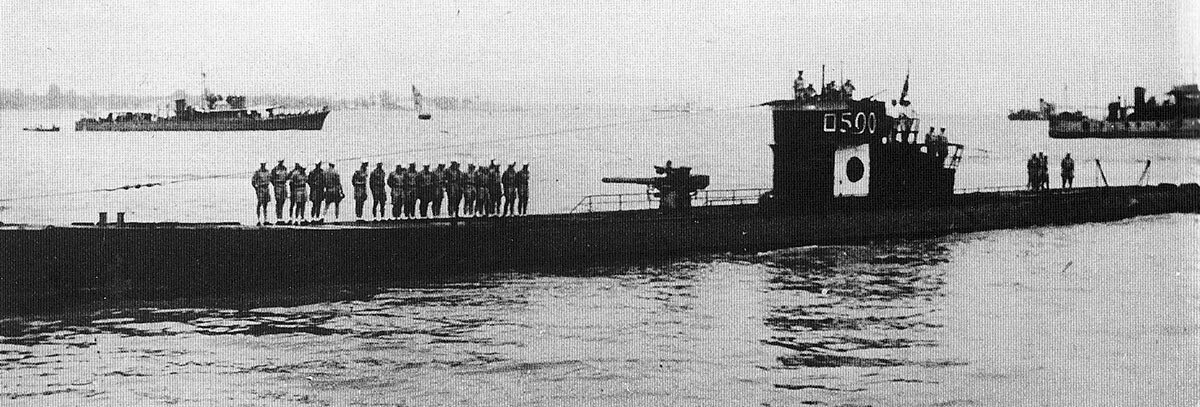
- The Japanese RO-500 ( ex-U-511 )
  U-123 had been scuttled in Lorient but was raised by the French after the war, repaired and recommissioned as Blaison.
- U-510 was returning from the Far East to Saint-Nazaire submarine base when the war ended and was captured there by the French. She was commissioned into the French Navy as Bouan.
- U-511 was a gift from Hitler to Japan, she arrived on 16 September 1943 in Japan and was renamed RO-500.
- U-1224 was another gift from Hitler to Japan. A Japanese crew was brought to Germany to commission her on 14 February 1944. She sailed for Japan on 30 March and was lost on her way.
- U-181, U-862 and U-195 were in the Far East when Germany surrendered in May 1945, were captured by the Japanese and commissioned into the Imperial Japanese Navy as I-501, I-502 and I-506 respectively.
- U-1231 surrendered at the end of the war and was given as a war prize to the Soviet Union. She was commissioned in the Soviet Navy as N.26.
- U-190 and U-889 were on patrol in the North Atlantic when Germany surrendered. They put into a Canadian port and both were commissioned in the Royal Canadian Navy, but U-889 was later transferred to the United States Navy.

== Specifications ==
Class	IXA	IXB	IXC	IXC/40	IXD1	IXD2 + IXD/42
Displacement surfaced in t (long tons)	1,032 (1,016)	1,051 (1,034)	1,120 (1,100)	1,144 (1,126)	1,610 (1,580)	1,616 (1,590)
Displacement submerged in t (long tons)	1,152 (1,134)	1,178 (1,159)	1,232 (1,213)	1,257 (1,237)	1,799 (1,771)	1,808 (1,779)
Length overall in m (ft)	76.50 (251.0)	76.50 (251.0)	76.76 (251.8)	76.76 (251.8)	87.58 (287.3)	87.5 (287)
Length pressure hull in m (ft)	58.75 (192.7)	58.75 (192.7)	58.75 (192.7)	58.75 (192.7)	68.50 (224.7)	--
Beam overall in m (ft)	6.51 (21.4)	6.76 (22.2)	6.76 (22.2)	6.86 (22.5)	7.50 (24.6)	7.50 (24.6)
Beam pressure hull in m (ft)	4.40 (14.4)	4.40 (14.4)	4.40 (14.4)	4.40 (14.4)	4.40 (14.4)	--
Height in m (ft)	9.40 (30.8)	9.60 (31.5)	9.60 (31.5)	9.60 (31.5)	10.20 (33.5)	--
Draft in m (ft)	4.70 (15.4)	4.70 (15.4)	4.70 (15.4)	4.67 (15.3)	5.35 (17.6)	5.35 (17.6)
Power surfaced (diesel) in hp (kW)	4,400 (3,300)				9,000 (6,700)	5,400 (4,000)
Power submerged (Electric) in hp (kW)	1,000 (750)					
Surface speed in knots (km/h, mph)	18.2 (33.7; 20.9)	18.2 (33.7; 20.9)	18.3 (33.9; 21.1)	18.3 (33.9; 21.1)	20.8 (38.5; 23.9)	19.2 (35.6; 22.1)
Submerged speed in knots (km/h, mph)	7.7 (14.3; 8.9)	7.3 (13.5; 8.4)	7.3 (13.5; 8.4)	7.3 (13.5; 8.4)	6.9 (12.8; 7.9)	6.9 (12.8; 7.9)
fuel capacity in t (long tons)	154 (152)	165 (162)	208 (205)	214 (211)	203 (200)	442 (435)
Surface range at 10 knots in nmi (km, mi)	10,500 (19,400; 12,100)	12,000 (22,000; 14,000)	13,450 (24,910; 15,480)	13,850 (25,650; 15,940)	12,750 (23,610; 14,670)	31,500 (58,300; 36,200)
Surface range at 12 knots in nmi (km, mi)	8,100 (15,000; 9,300)	8,700 (16,100; 10,000)	11,000 (20,000; 13,000)	11,400 (21,100; 13,100)	9,900 (18,300; 11,400)	23,700 (43,900; 27,300)
Submerged range at 4 knots in nmi (km, mi)	65 (120; 75)	64 (119; 74)	63 (117; 72)	63 (117; 72)	115 (213; 132)	57 (106; 66)
Construction diving depth in m (ft)	100 m (328 ft 1 in)					
Test diving depth in m (ft)	150 m (492 ft 2 in)					
Crush diving depth in m (ft)	250 m (820 ft 3 in)					
Bow tubes	4					
Stern tubes	2					
Torpedoes (maximum)	22	22	22	22	22	24
Complement	48	48	48	48	55	55-64
Commissioned	8	14	54	87	2	28 + 1

== Series of Type IX hull numbers ==
A total of 290 Type IXs were ordered, of which 194 were commissioned. At the end of the war, six were laid down but not yet commissioned. The orders for the remaining ninety U-boats were suspended in 1943 and definitively cancelled in 1944. A further sixty-eight hull numbers were reserved for Type IXs, but these hull numbers were never ordered.

Type IX U-boat series.
Series	Type	Yard	Year ordered	Year commissioned or cancelled	Number commissioned	Number laid down, but not commissioned	Number cancelled
U-37 – U-44	IXA	Deschimag AG Weser, Bremen	1936	1938–39	8		
U-64 – U-65	IXB	Deschimag AG Weser, Bremen	1937	1939–41	2		
U-103 – U-111	IXB	Deschimag AG Weser, Bremen	1937	1939–41	9		
U-122 – U-124	IXB	Deschimag AG Weser, Bremen	1937	1939–41	3		
U-66 – U-68	IXC	Deschimag AG Weser, Bremen	1939	1940–41	3		
U-125 – U-131	IXC	Deschimag AG Weser, Bremen	1939	1940–41	7		
U-153 – U-160	IXC	Deschimag AG Weser, Bremen	1939	1940–41	8		
U-171 – U-176	IXC	Deschimag AG Weser, Bremen	1939	1940–41	6		
U-161 – U-166	IXC	Deschimag Seebeck, Wesermunde	1939	1941–42	6		
U-501 – U-524	IXC	Deutsche Werft, Hamburg	1939	1941–42	24		
U-167 – U-170	IXC/40	Deschimag Seebeck, Wesermunde	1940	1942–44	4		
U-801 – U-806 (Note: Möller & Brack do not list U-804 as commissioned, but Herzog and Bagnasco do. Blair mentions 2 war patrols for U-804 so this U-boat was commissioned.)	IXC/40	Deschimag Seebeck, Wesermunde	1940	1942–44	6		
U-807 – U-816	IXC/40	Deschimag Seebeck, Wesermunde	1940	1944			10
U-817 – U-820	IXC/40	Deschimag Seebeck, Wesermunde	--	--			
U-183 – U-194	IXC/40	Deschimag AG Weser, Bremen	1940	1942–44	12		
U-841 – U-846	IXC/40	Deschimag AG Weser, Bremen	1940	1942–44	6		
U-853 – U-858	IXC/40	Deschimag AG Weser, Bremen	1940	1942–44	6		
U-865 – U-870	IXC/40	Deschimag AG Weser, Bremen	1940	1942–44	6		
U-877 – U-881	IXC/40	Deschimag AG Weser, Bremen	1940	1942–44	5		
U-882	IXC/40	Deschimag AG Weser, Bremen	1940	1944			1
U-889	IXC/40	Deschimag AG Weser, Bremen	1940	1944	1		
U-890 – U-891	IXC/40	Deschimag AG Weser, Bremen	1940	--		2	
U-892 – U-894 (Note: Bagnasco counts U-892 - U-894 twice: these three U-boats are listed both as cancelled and as laid down but not commissioned. Herzog has them listed as built.)	IXC/40	Deschimag AG Weser, Bremen	1940	1944			3
U-525 – U-550	IXC/40	Deutsche Werft, Hamburg	1940	1942–43	26		
U-1221 – U-1235	IXC/40	Deutsche Werft, Hamburg	1940	1943–45	15		
U-1236 – U-1238	IXC/40	Deutsche Werft, Hamburg	1940	--		3	
U-1239 – U-1262	IXC/40	Deutsche Werft, Hamburg	1940	1944			24
U-1501 – U-1506	IXC/40	Deschimag Seebeck, Wesermunde	1940	1944			6
U-1507 – U-1530	IXC/40	Deschimag AG Weser, Bremen	1940	1944			24
U-180	IXD1	Deschimag AG Weser, Bremen	1940	1942	1		
U-195	IXD1	Deschimag AG Weser, Bremen	1940	1942	1		
U-177 – U-179	IXD2	Deschimag AG Weser, Bremen	1940	1942–45	3		
U-181 – U-182	IXD2	Deschimag AG Weser, Bremen	1940	1942–45	2		
U-196 – U-200	IXD2	Deschimag AG Weser, Bremen	1940	1942–45	5		
U-847 – U-852	IXD2	Deschimag AG Weser, Bremen	1940	1942–45	6		
U-859 – U-864	IXD2	Deschimag AG Weser, Bremen	1940	1942–45	6		
U-871 – U-876	IXD2	Deschimag AG Weser, Bremen	1940	1942–45	6		
U-883	IXD/42	Deschimag AG Weser, Bremen	1940	1945	1		
U-884	IXD/42	Deschimag AG Weser, Bremen	1940	--		1	
U-885 – U-886	IXD/42	Deschimag AG Weser, Bremen	1940	1944			2
U-887 – U-888	IXD/42	--	1940	1944			2
U-895 – U-900	IXD/42	--	1940	1944			6
U-1531 – U-1542	IXD/42	--	1940	1944			12
U-1543 – U-1600	IXD/42	--	--	--			
Totals					194	6	90
