= German submarine Wilhelm Bauer =

German World War II submarine

Coordinates: 53°32′29″N 8°34′40″E

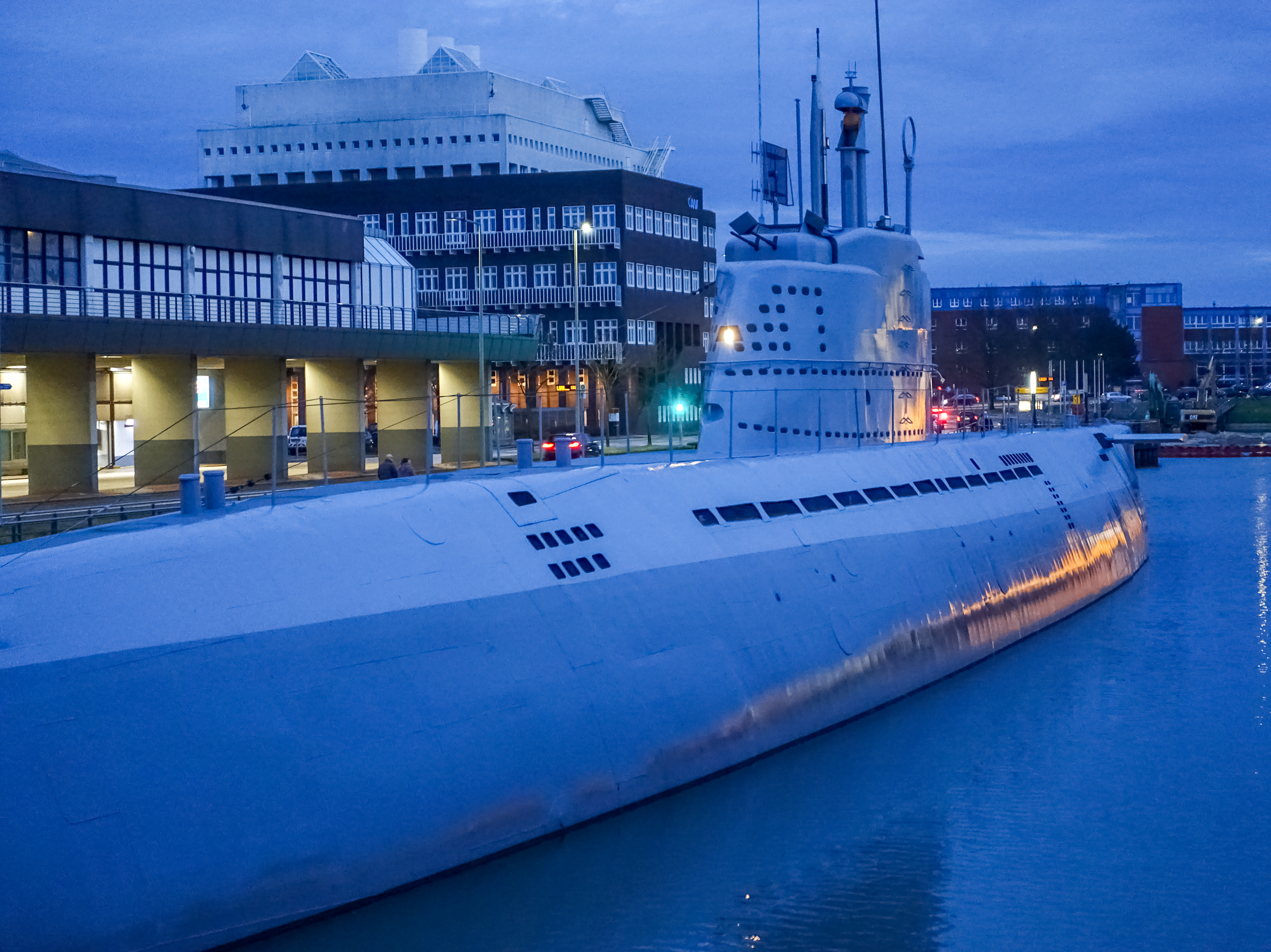
- Wilhelm Bauer (U-2540) at night

History

Nazi Germany
- Name: U-2540
- Ordered: 6 November 1943
- Builder: Blohm & Voss, Hamburg
- Yard number: 2540
- Laid down: 28 October 1944
- Launched: 13 January 1945
- Commissioned: 24 February 1945
- Fate: Scuttled on 4 May 1945; Raised in June 1957

West Germany
- Name: Wilhelm Bauer
- Namesake: Wilhelm Bauer
- Commissioned: 1 September 1960
- Decommissioned: 28 August 1968
- In service: May 1970
- Out of service: 15 March 1982
- Fate: Museum ship on 27 April 1984

General characteristics
- Class & type: Type XXI submarine
- Displacement: 1,621 t (1,595 long tons) surfaced; 2,100 t (2,067 long tons) submerged
- Length: 76.70 m (251 ft 8 in) (o/a)
- Beam: 8 m (26 ft 3 in)
- Height: 11.30 m (37 ft 1 in)
- Draught: 6.32 m (20 ft 9 in)
- Propulsion: Diesel/Electric; 2 × MAN M6V40/46KBB supercharged 6-cylinder diesel engines, 4,000 PS (2,900 kW; 3,900 shp); 2 × SSW GU365/30 double acting electric motors, 5,000 PS (3,700 kW; 4,900 shp); 2 × SSW GV232/28 silent running electric motors, 226 PS (166 kW; 223 shp)
- Speed: Surfaced: 15.6 knots (28.9 km/h; 18.0 mph) (diesel); 17.9 knots (33.2 km/h; 20.6 mph) (electric); Submerged: 17.2 knots (31.9 km/h; 19.8 mph) (electric); 6.1 knots (11.3 km/h; 7.0 mph) (silent running motors)
- Range: 15,500 nmi (28,700 km; 17,800 mi) at 10 knots (19 km/h; 12 mph) surfaced; 340 nmi (630 km; 390 mi) at 5 knots (9.3 km/h; 5.8 mph) submerged
- Test depth: 240 m (790 ft)
- Complement: 5 officers, 52 enlisted
- Sensors & processing systems: Type F432 D2 Radar Transmitter; FuMB Ant 3 Bali Radar Detector
- Armament: 6 × bow torpedo tubes; 23 × 53.3 cm (21 in) torpedoes; or 17 × torpedoes and 12 × mines; 4 × 2 cm (0.79 in) C/30 AA guns

Service record (Kriegsmarine)
- Part of: 31st U-boat Flotilla; 24 February – 4 May 1945
- Identification codes: M 52 062
- Commanders: Oblt.z.S. Rudolf Schultze; 24 February – 4 May 1945
- Operations: None
- Victories: None

German submarine Wilhelm Bauer (originally designated U-2540) is a Type XXI U-boat of Nazi Germany's navy (Kriegsmarine), completed shortly before the end of World War II. It was scuttled at the end of the war, having never gone on patrol. In 1957, it was raised from the seabed off Flensburg Firth, refurbished, and recommissioned for use by the West-German Bundesmarine in 1960. Finally retired fully in 1983, it is the only floating example of a Type XXI U-boat. It has been modified to appear in wartime configuration and exhibited at the German Maritime Museum in Bremerhaven, Germany.

== Design ==
Like all Type XXI U-boats, U-2540 had a displacement of 1,621 tonnes (1,595 long tons) when at the surface and 2,100 tonnes (2,067 long tons) while submerged. She had a total length of 76.70 m (251 ft 8 in), a beam of 8 m (26 ft 3 in), and a draught of 6.32 m (20 ft 9 in). The submarine was powered by two MAN SE supercharged six-cylinder M6V40/46KBB diesel engines each providing 4,000 metric horsepower (2,900 kilowatts; 3,900 shaft horsepower), two Siemens-Schuckert GU365/30 double-acting electric motors each providing 5,000 PS (3,700 kW; 4,900 shp), and two Siemens-Schuckert silent running GV232/28 electric motors each providing 226 PS (166 kW; 223 shp).

The submarine had a maximum surface speed of 15.6 knots (28.9 km/h; 18.0 mph) and a submerged speed of 17.2 knots (31.9 km/h; 19.8 mph). When running on silent motors the boat could operate at a speed of 6.1 knots (11.3 km/h; 7.0 mph). When submerged, the boat could operate at 5 knots (9.3 km/h; 5.8 mph) for 340 nautical miles (630 km; 390 mi); when surfaced, she could travel 15,500 nautical miles (28,700 km; 17,800 mi) at 10 knots (19 km/h; 12 mph). U-2540 was fitted with six 53.3 cm (21.0 in) torpedo tubes in the bow and four 2 cm (0.79 in) C/30 anti-aircraft guns. She could carry twenty-three torpedoes or seventeen torpedoes and twelve mines. The complement was five officers and fifty-two men.

== Construction and wartime service ==
Construction of U-2540 began on 28 October 1944 by Blohm & Voss in Hamburg-Finkenwerder. She was launched on 13 January 1945 and commissioned on 24 February 1945 as part of the 31st U-boat Flotilla for training purposes. In April 1945 the boat went to the front after training at Rønne on Bornholm. Due to the ongoing fuel shortages at the end of the war, the boat was relocated to Swinemünde before being scuttled near the Flensburg lightship on 4 May 1945.

== Salvage, refit and new service ==
In June 1957, after more than 12 years on the floor of the Baltic Sea, U-2540 was raised and overhauled at Howaldtswerke, Kiel. The submarine was commissioned as a research vessel in the Bundesmarine, serving from 1 September 1960 until 28 August 1968 as a test boat (class 241). On relaunch she was renamed Wilhelm Bauer, after the designer of the first German U-boat, Brandtaucher, built in Kiel by August Howaldt in 1850. From May 1970 she again entered service, this time with a civilian crew and served as a testbed for the technical innovations of the Type 206 U-boat. After an underwater collision with the German destroyer Z-3 (D172) on 6 May 1980 Wilhelm Bauer was discharged from use at Eckernförde on 18 November 1980 and finally released from service in 1983.

== Conversion to museum ship ==
U-2540 was put on sale by the Ministry of Defence and acquired by the board of trustees of the German Maritime Museum Association and the German Maritime Museum in Bremerhaven. The boat was restored to its original World War II configuration after its transfer in August 1983 to the Seebeck yard, opening on 27 April 1984 as a museum ship in Bremerhaven, now sponsored by the Wilhelm Bauer Technology Museum association. It has a replica twin 20mm cannon mount and the bridge is not glazed as it was during service with the Bundesmarine.

== In popular culture ==
Whilhem Bauer was featured in an episode of the documentary series Nazi Megastructures in 2016, with an episode titled "Hitler's Killer Subs", which included the history of the design and construction of the Type XXI submarine.

== Gallery ==
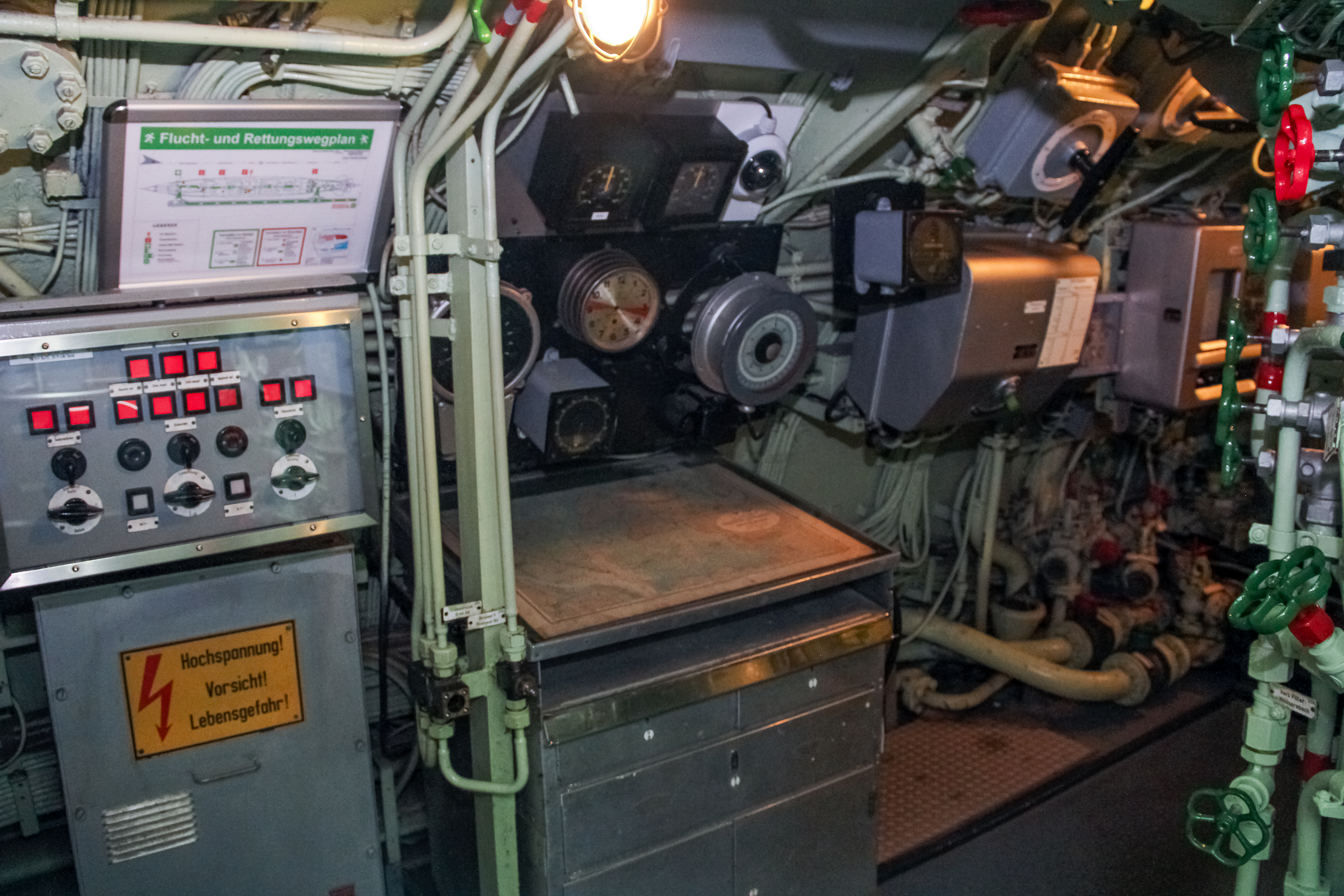

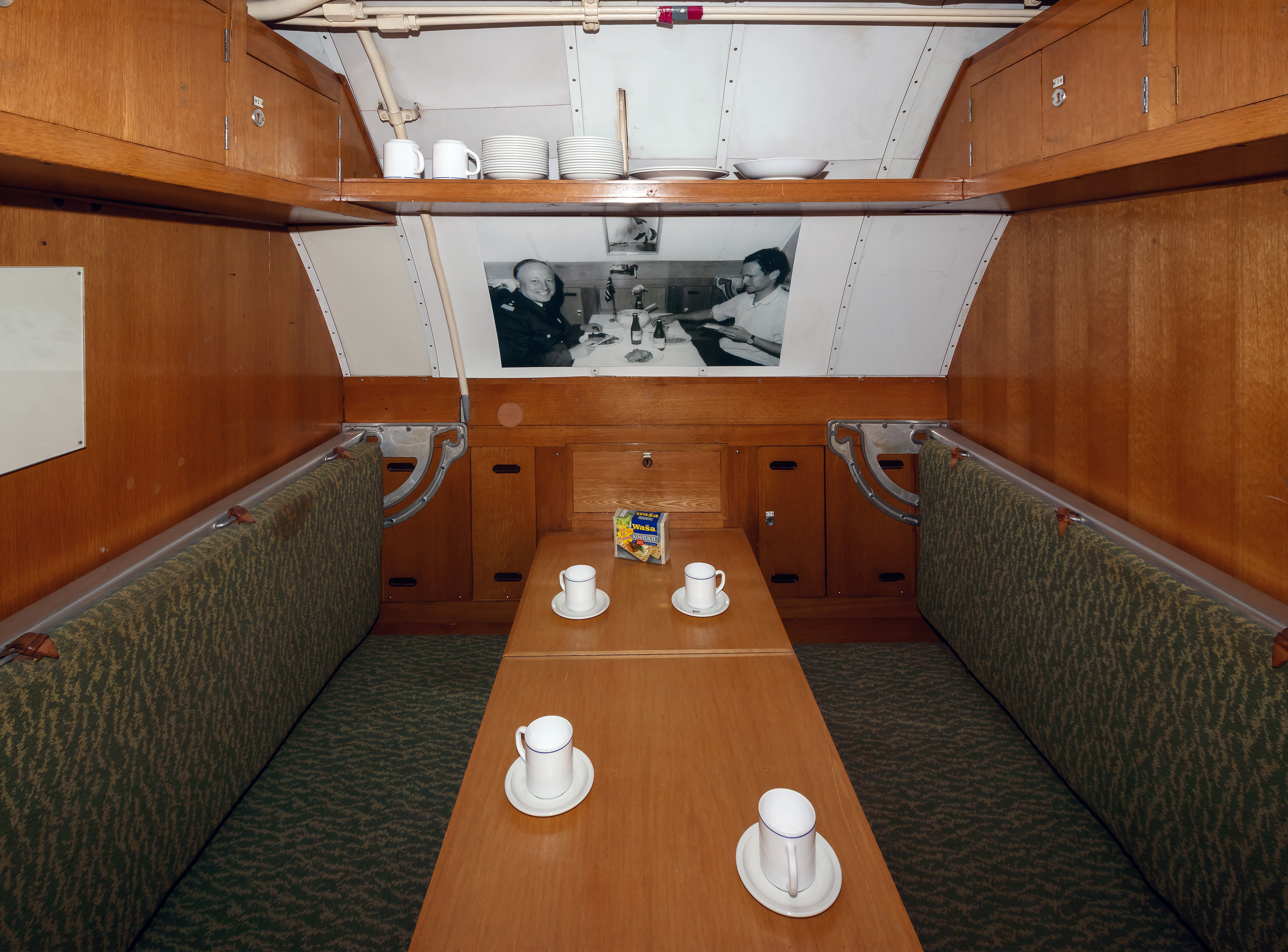
Officers dining quarters

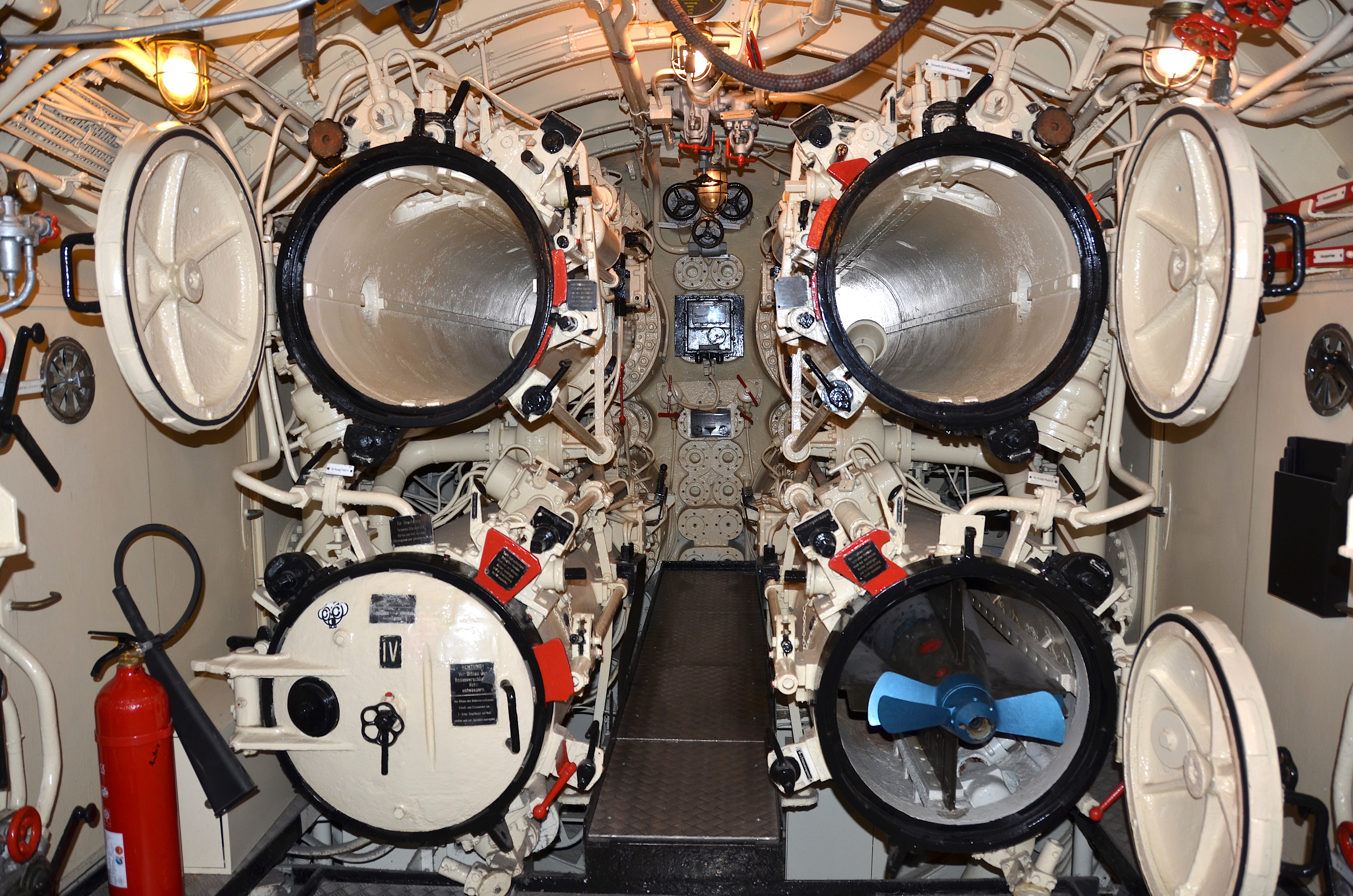
The four uppermost bow torpedo tubes on the submarine (Class 241)

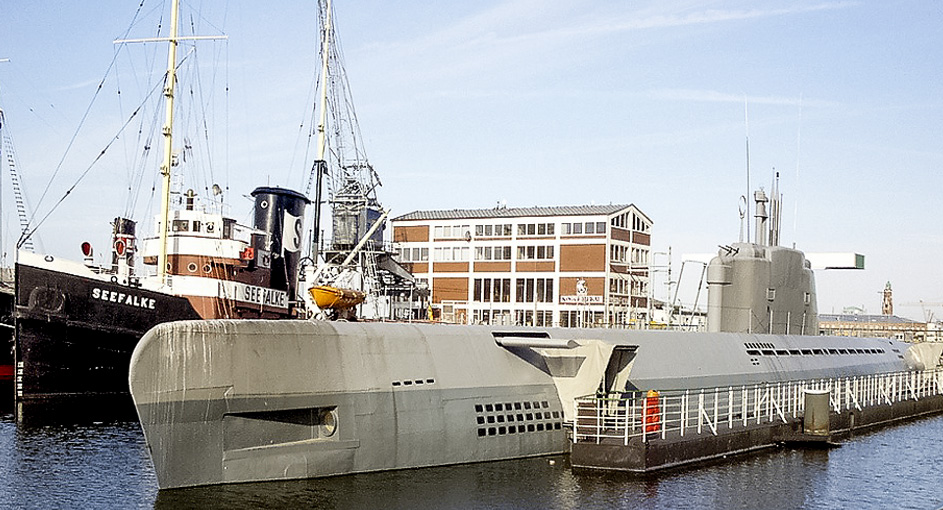
Wilhelm Bauer in Bremerhaven (2002)

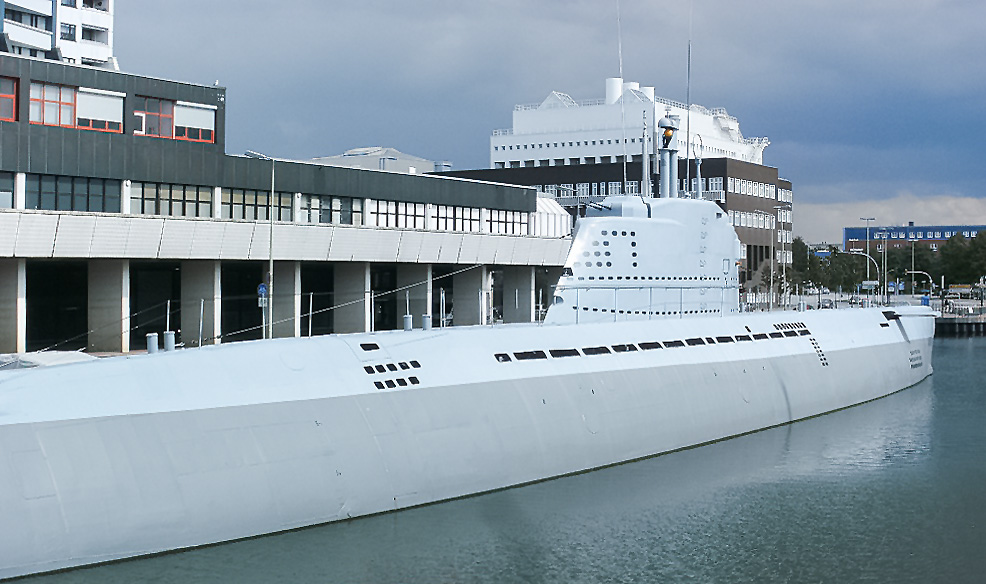

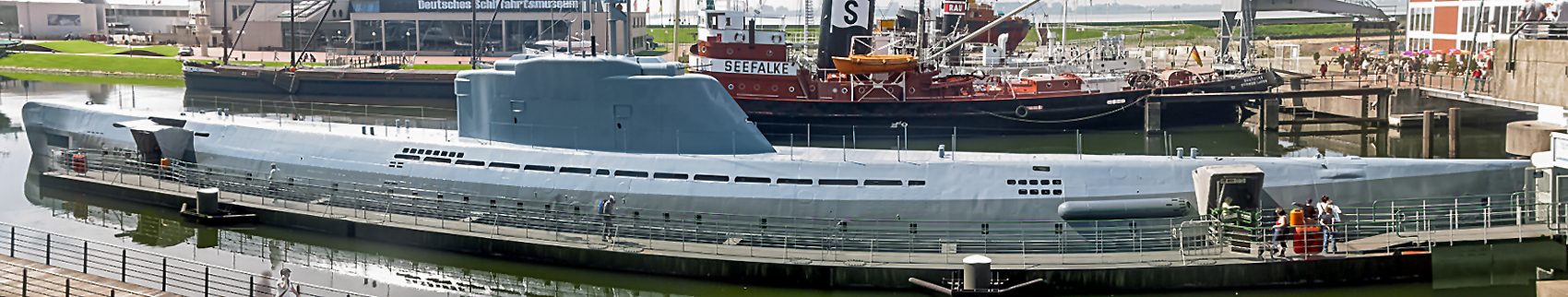
Wilhelm Bauer, panoramic view

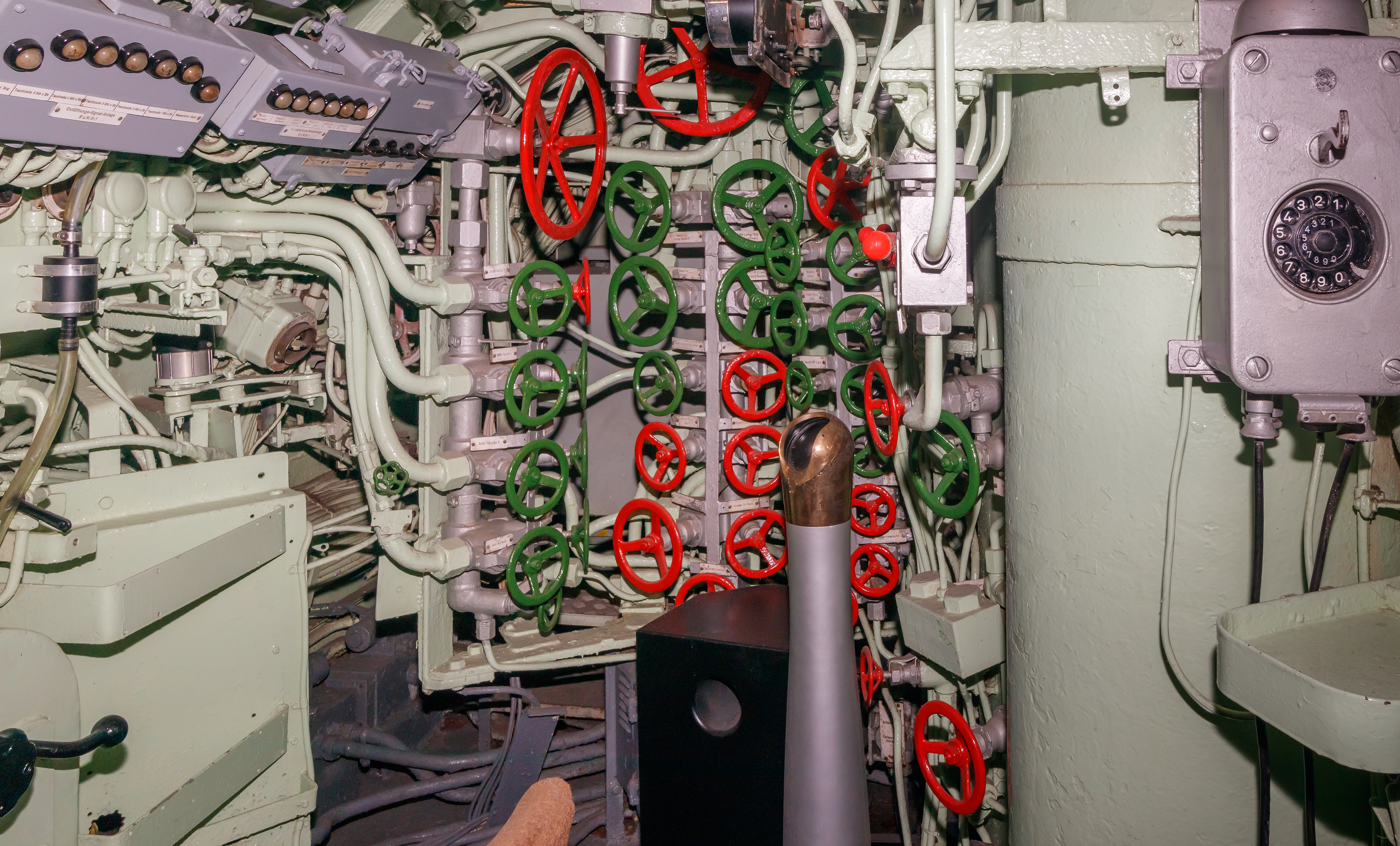

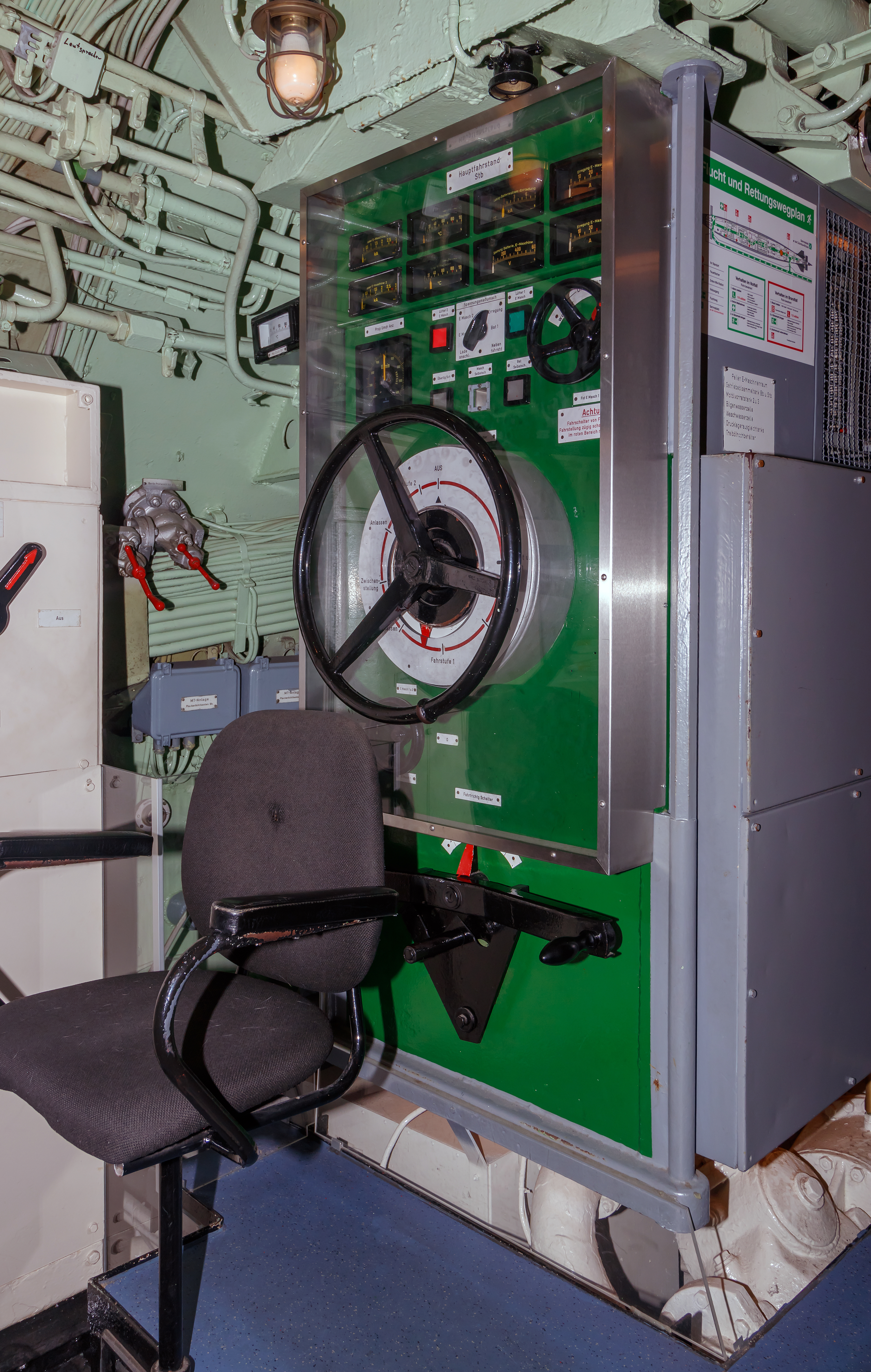

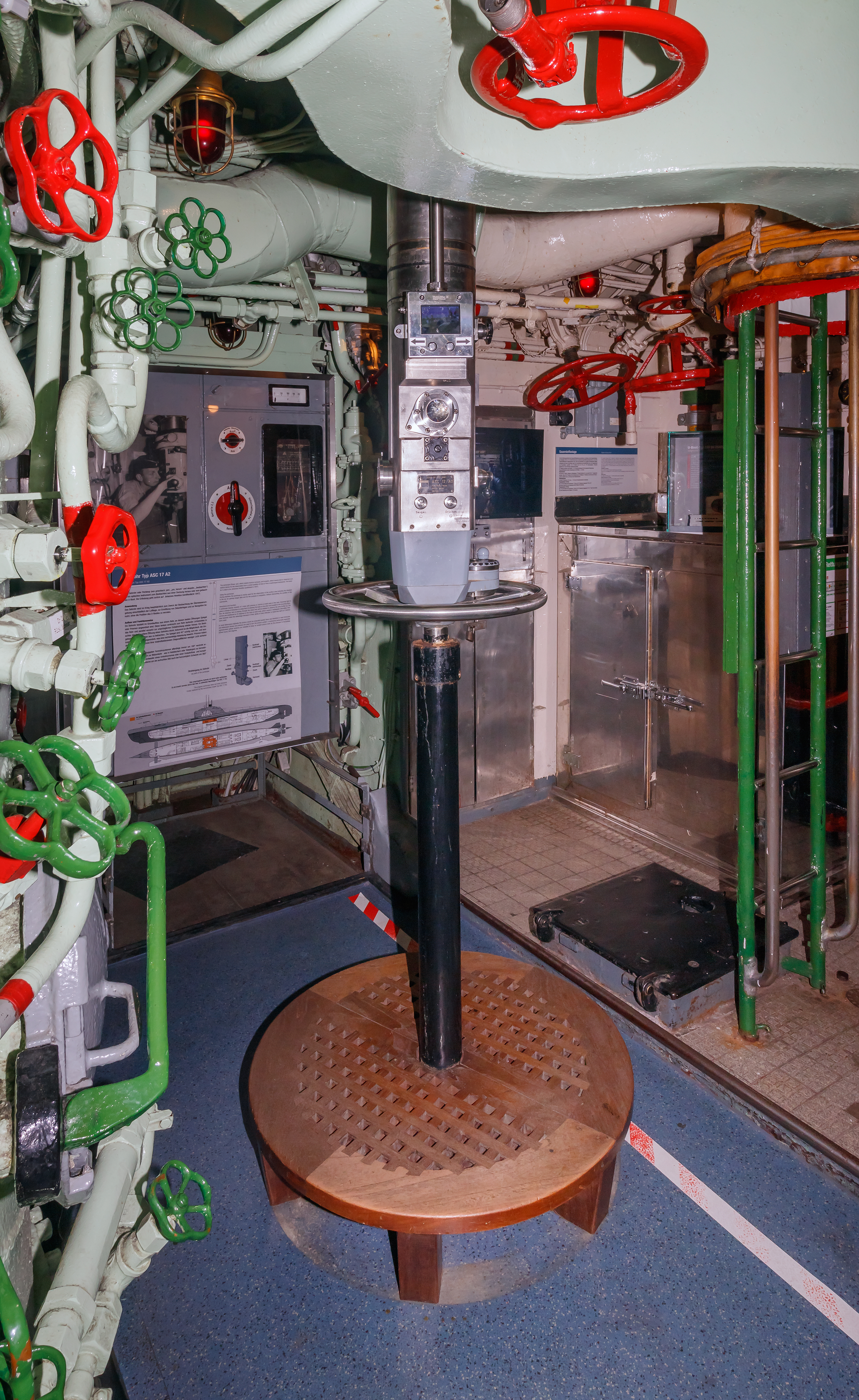

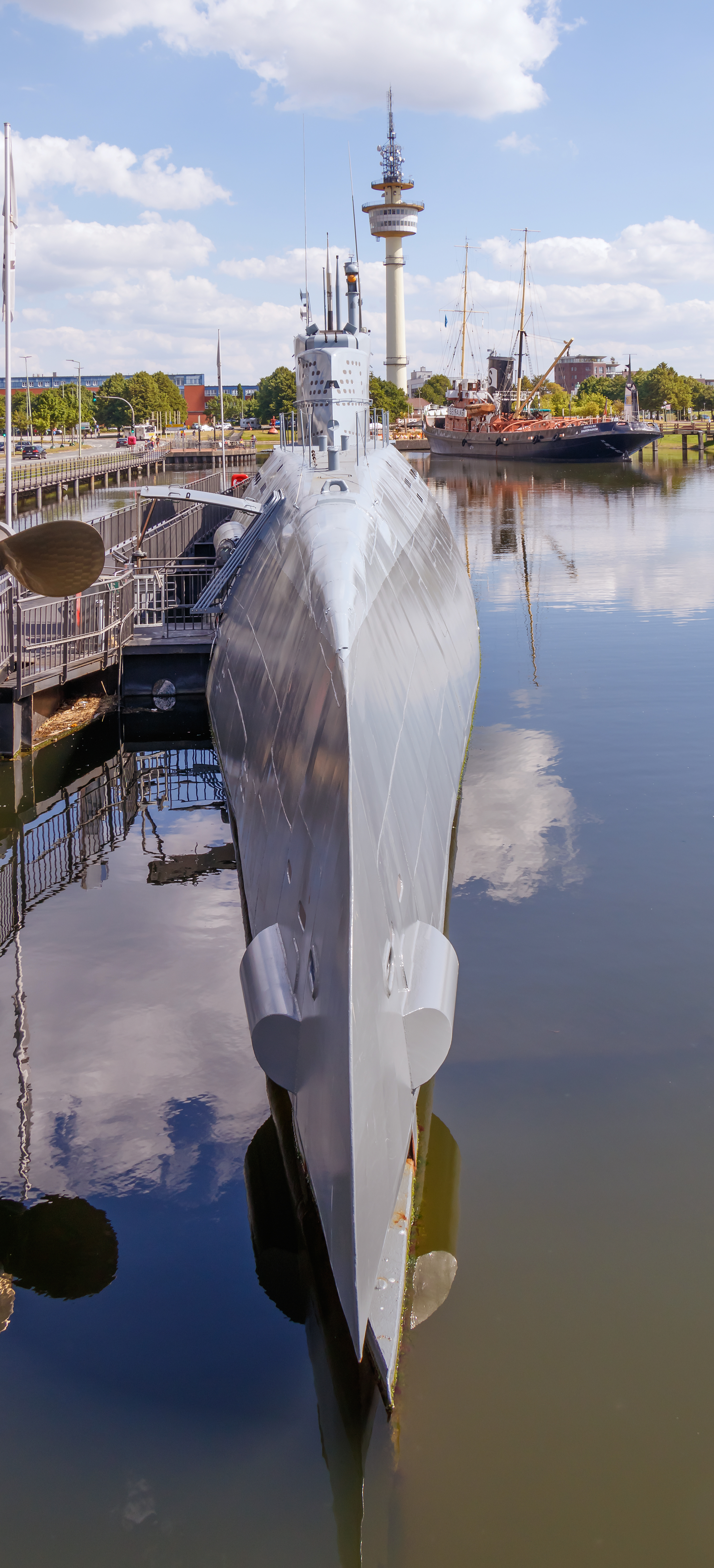

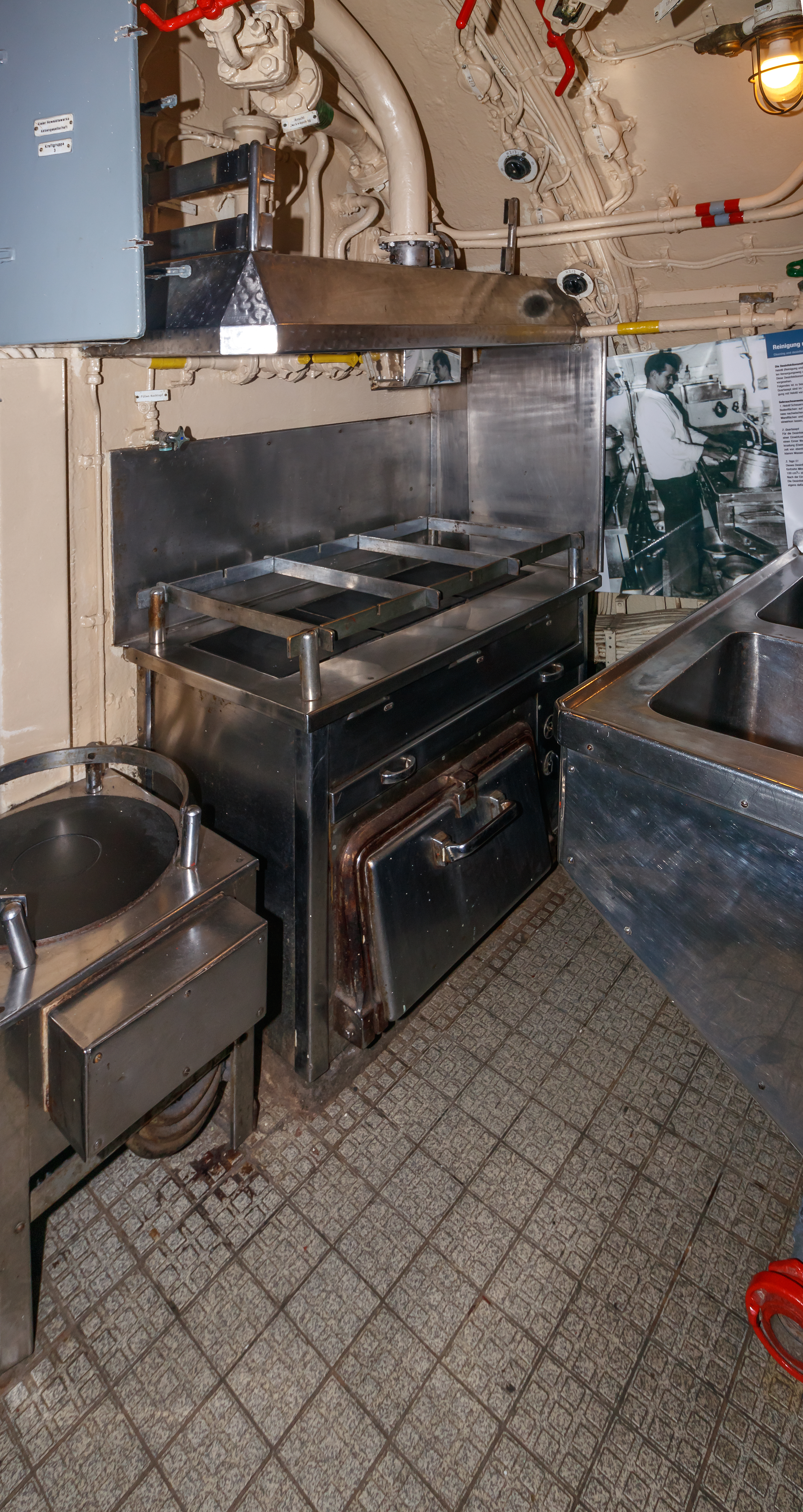

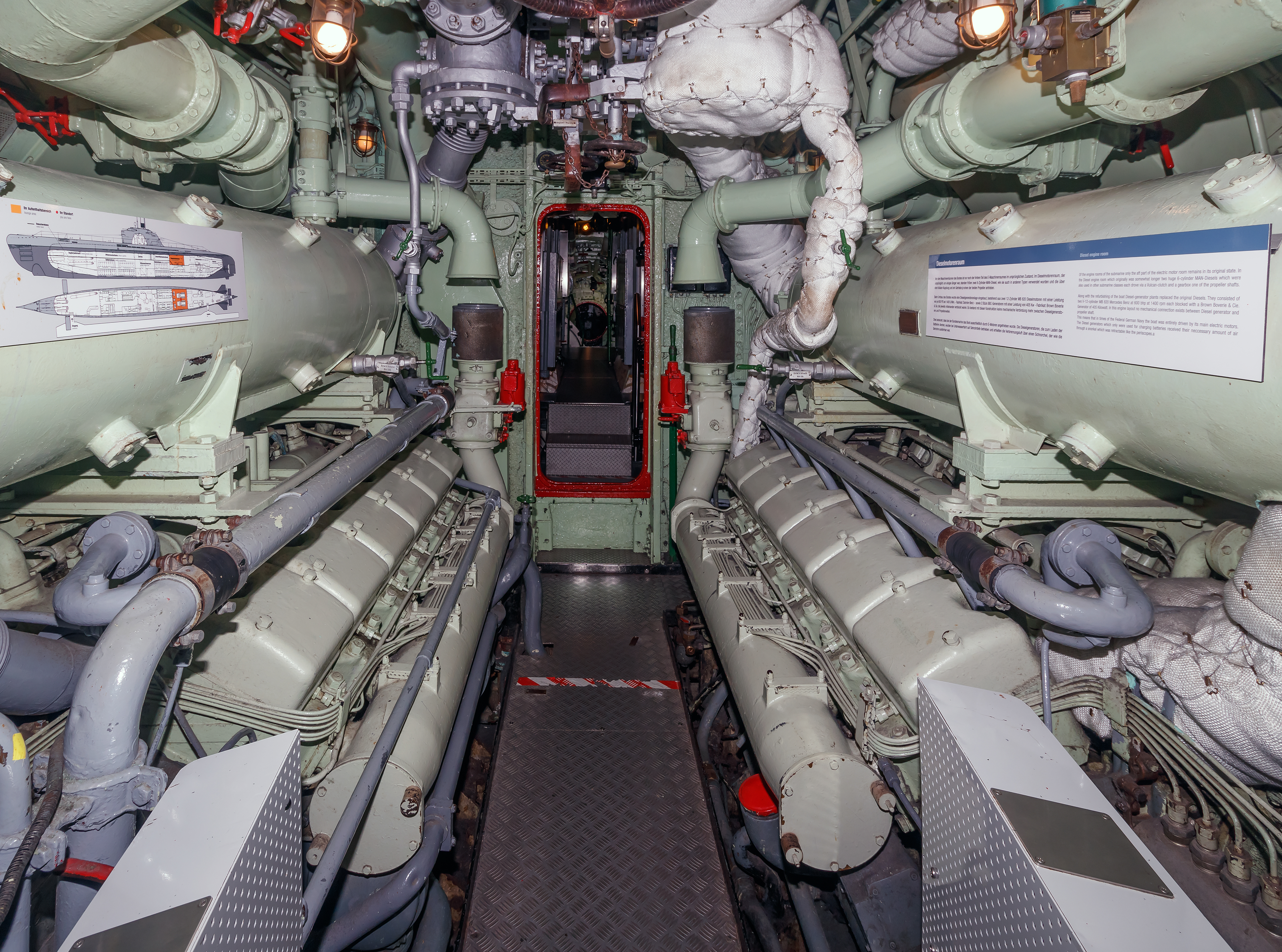

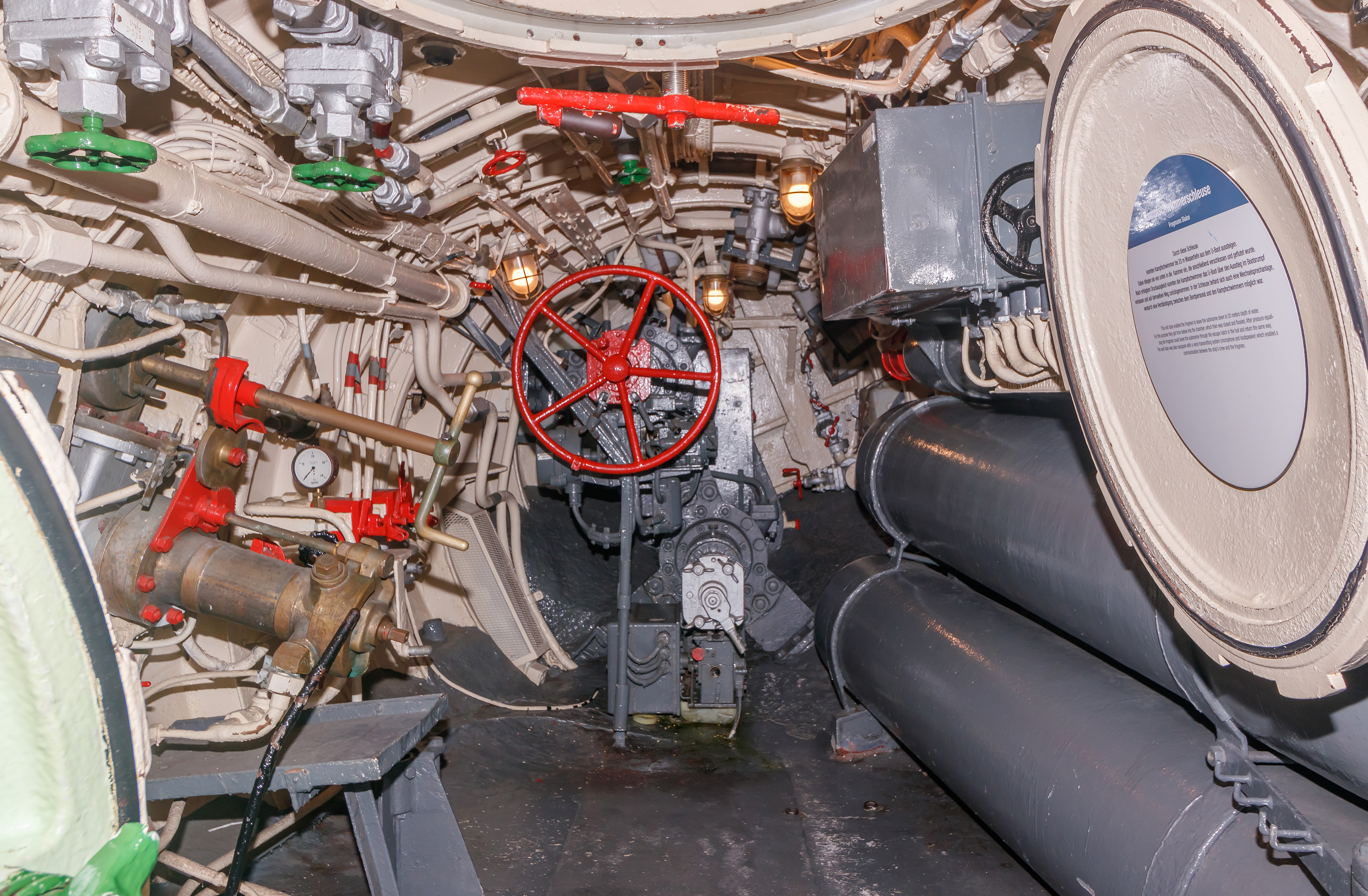

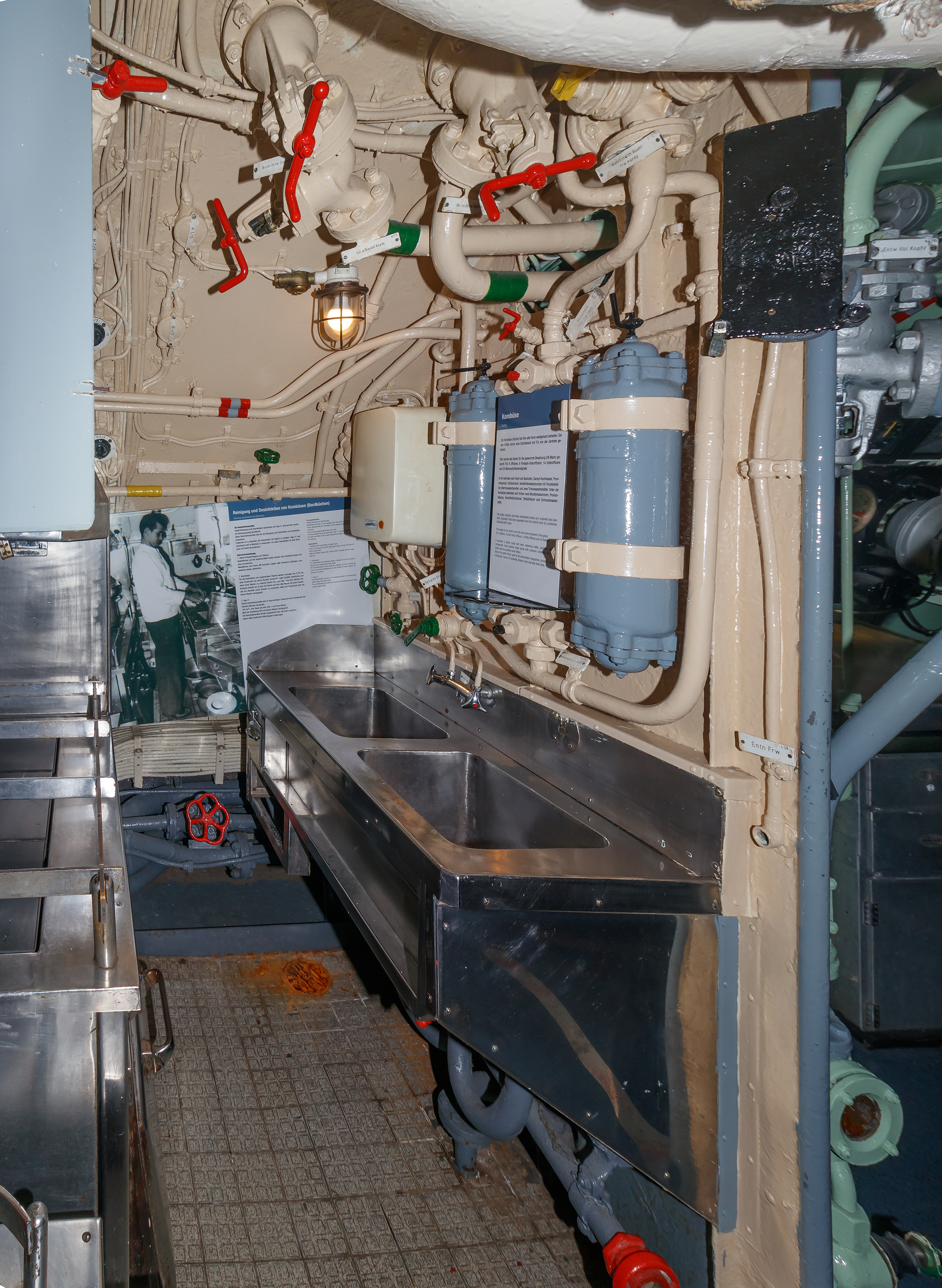

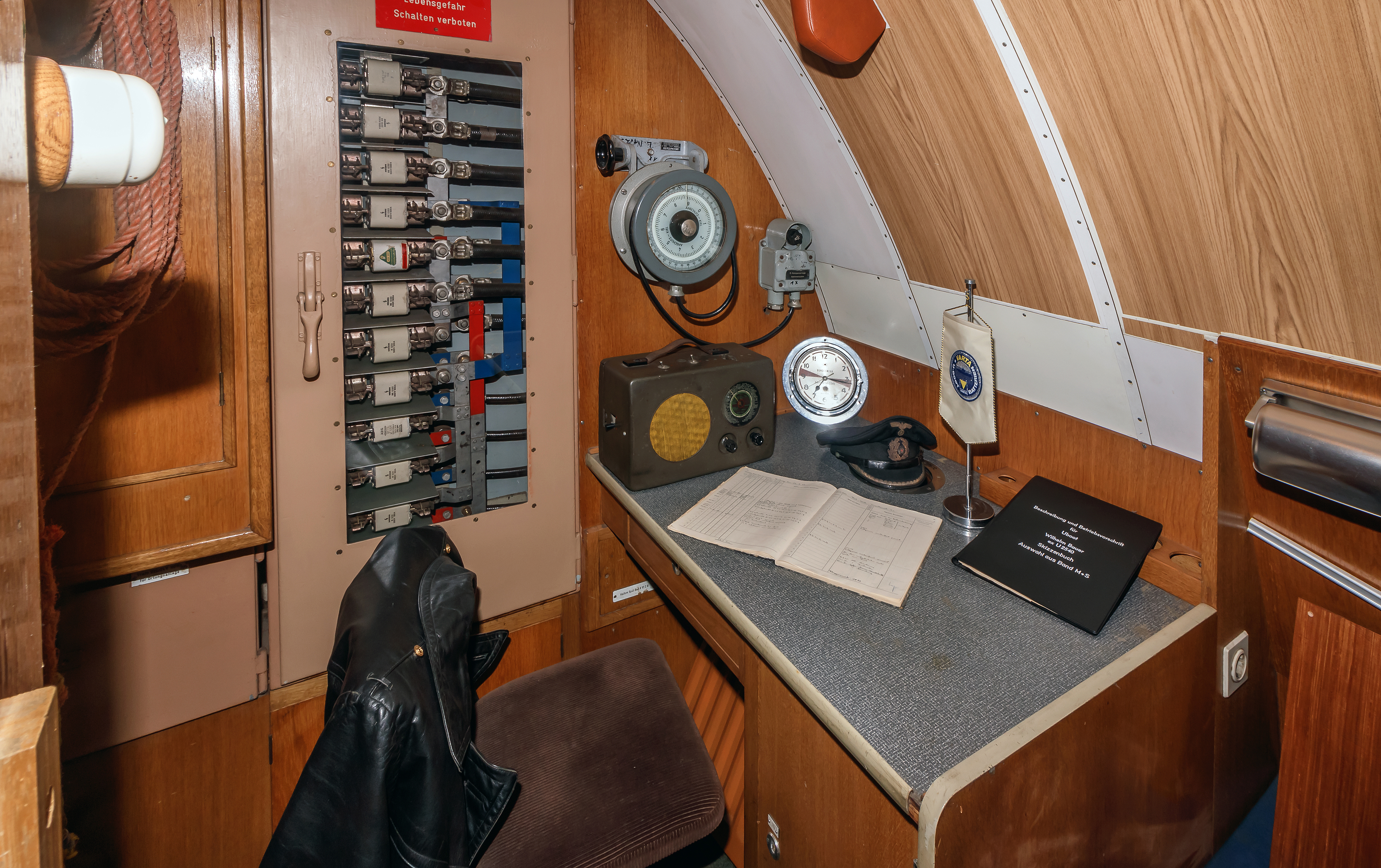

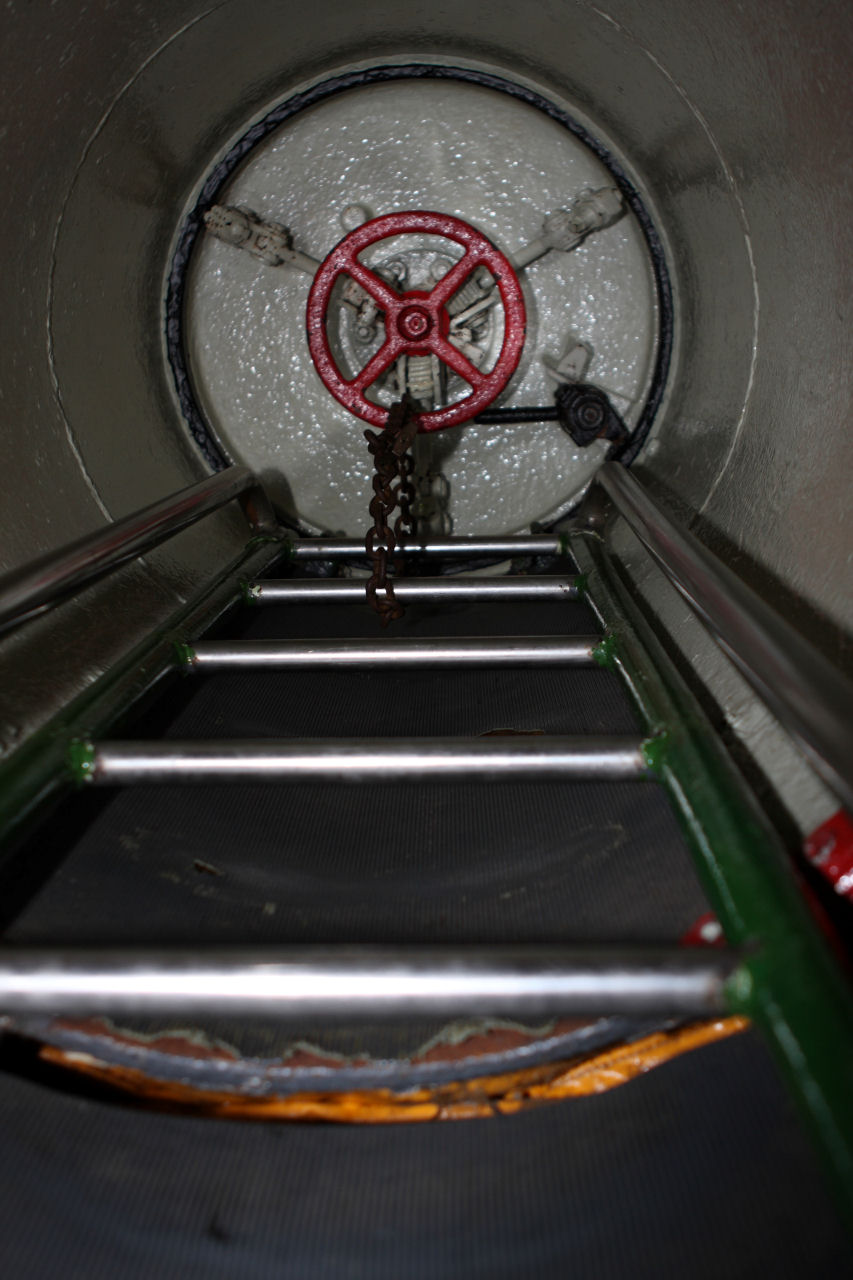

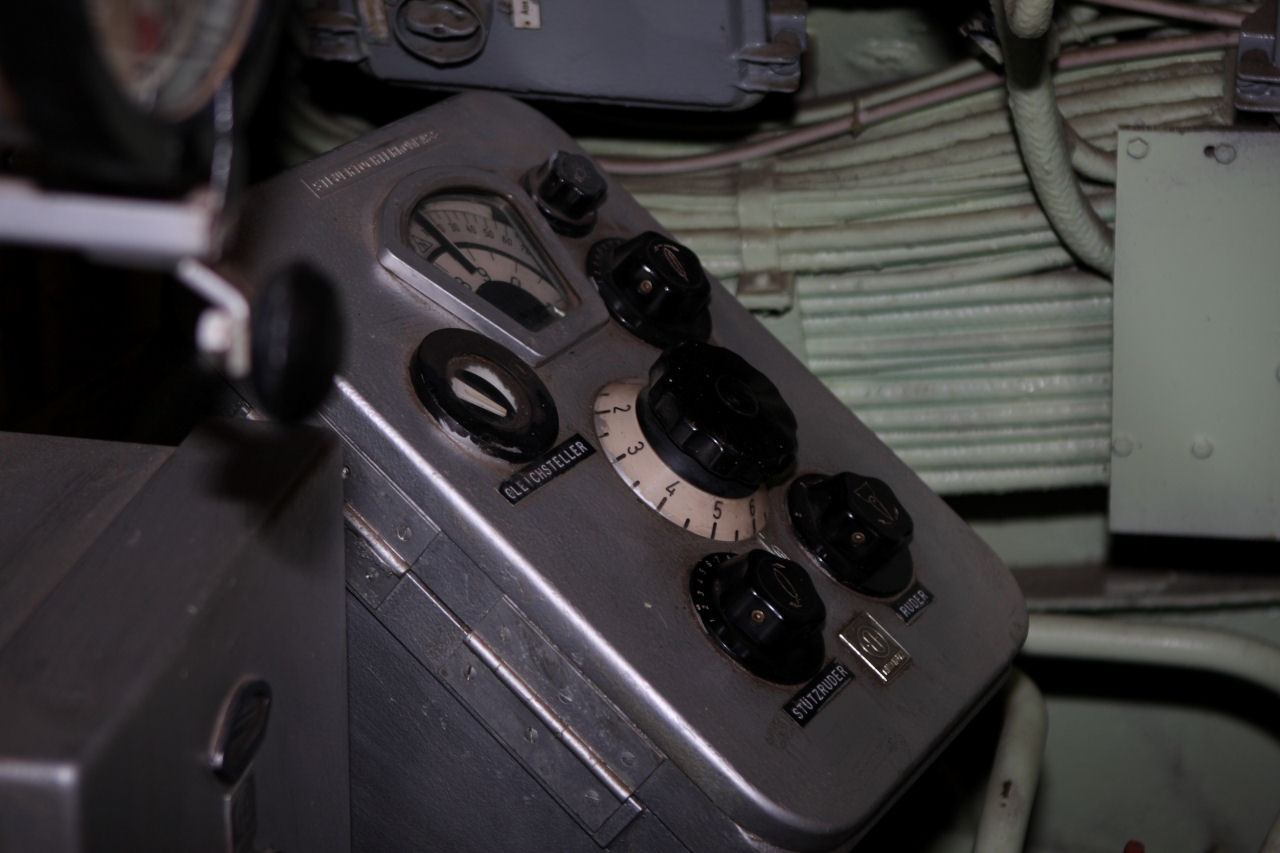

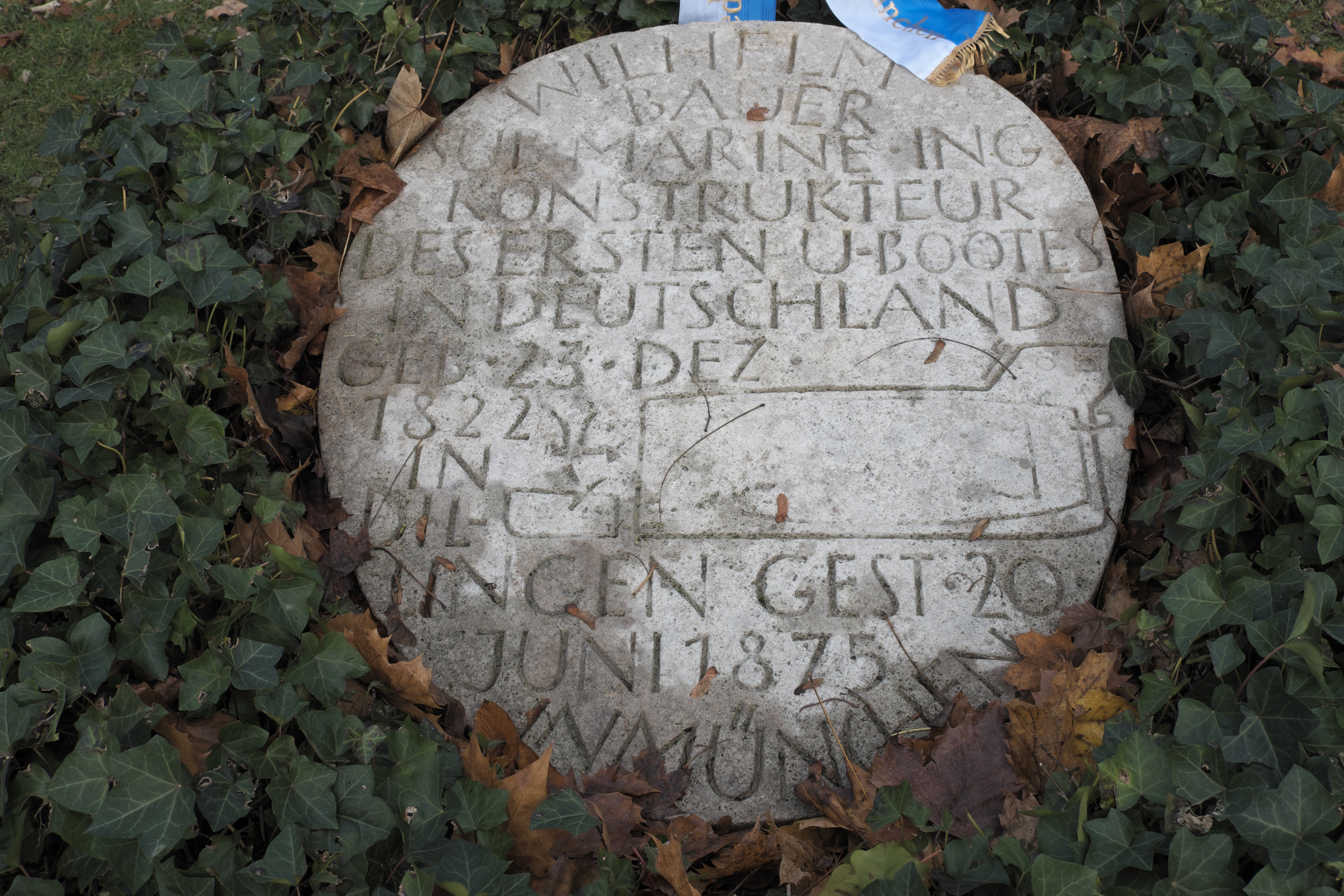

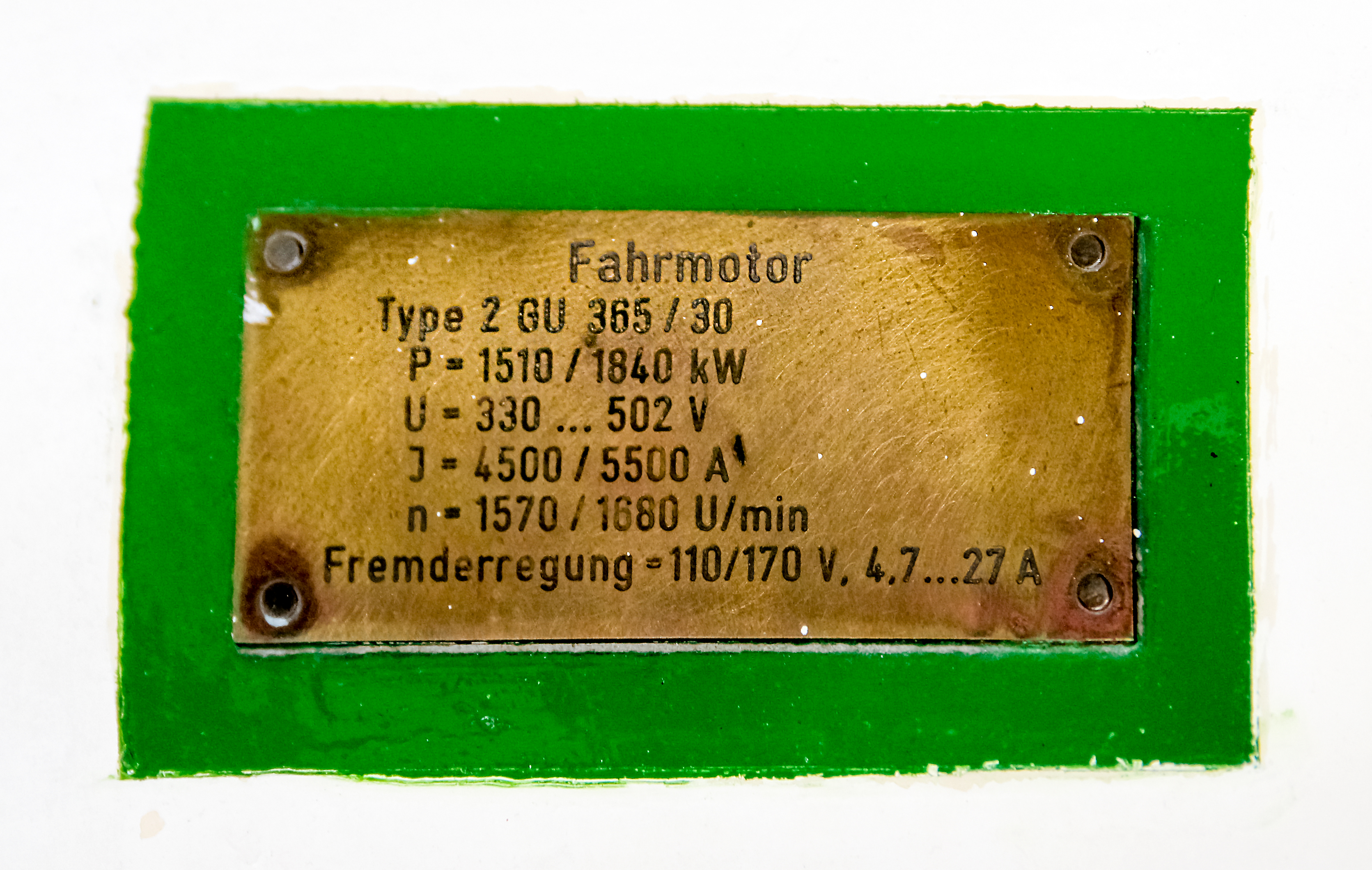

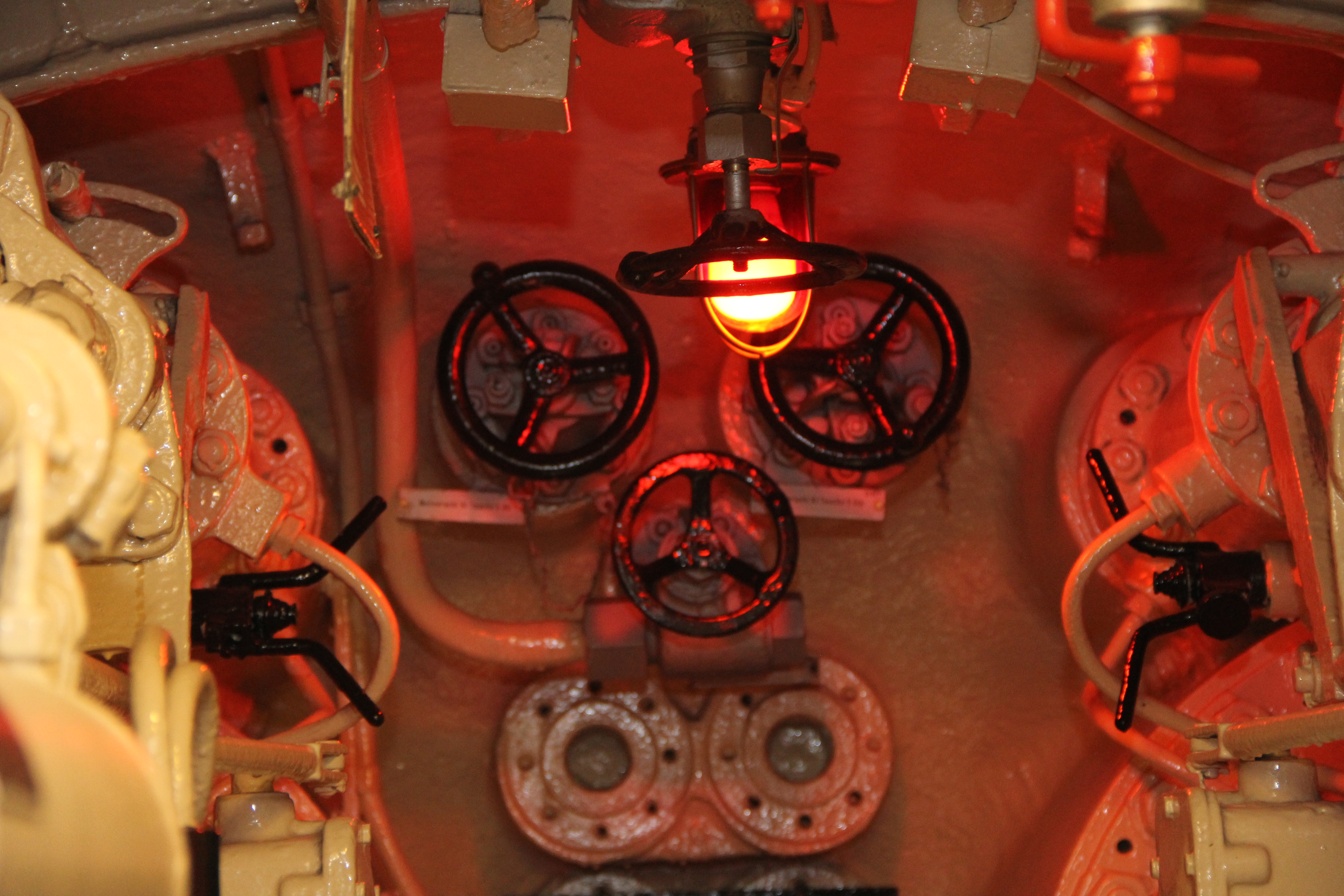

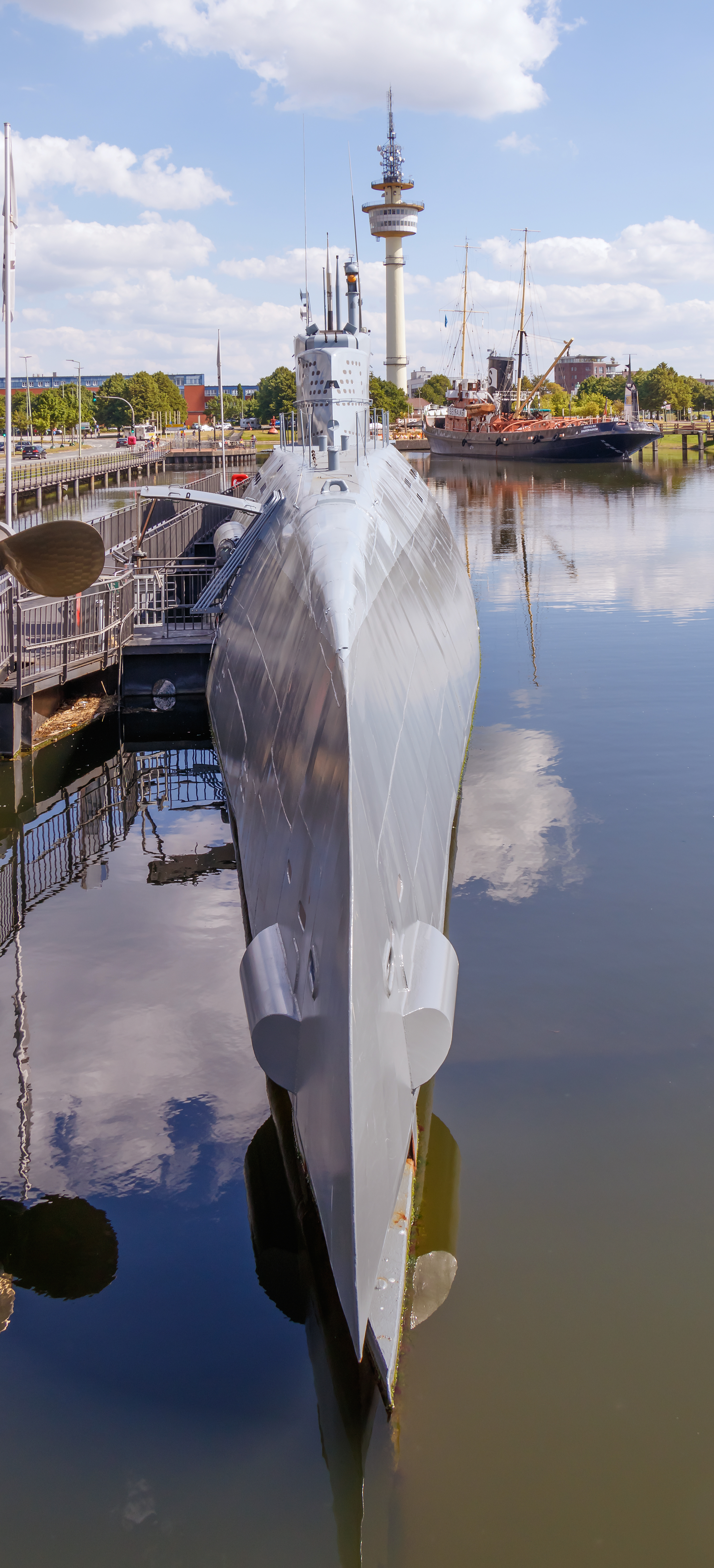

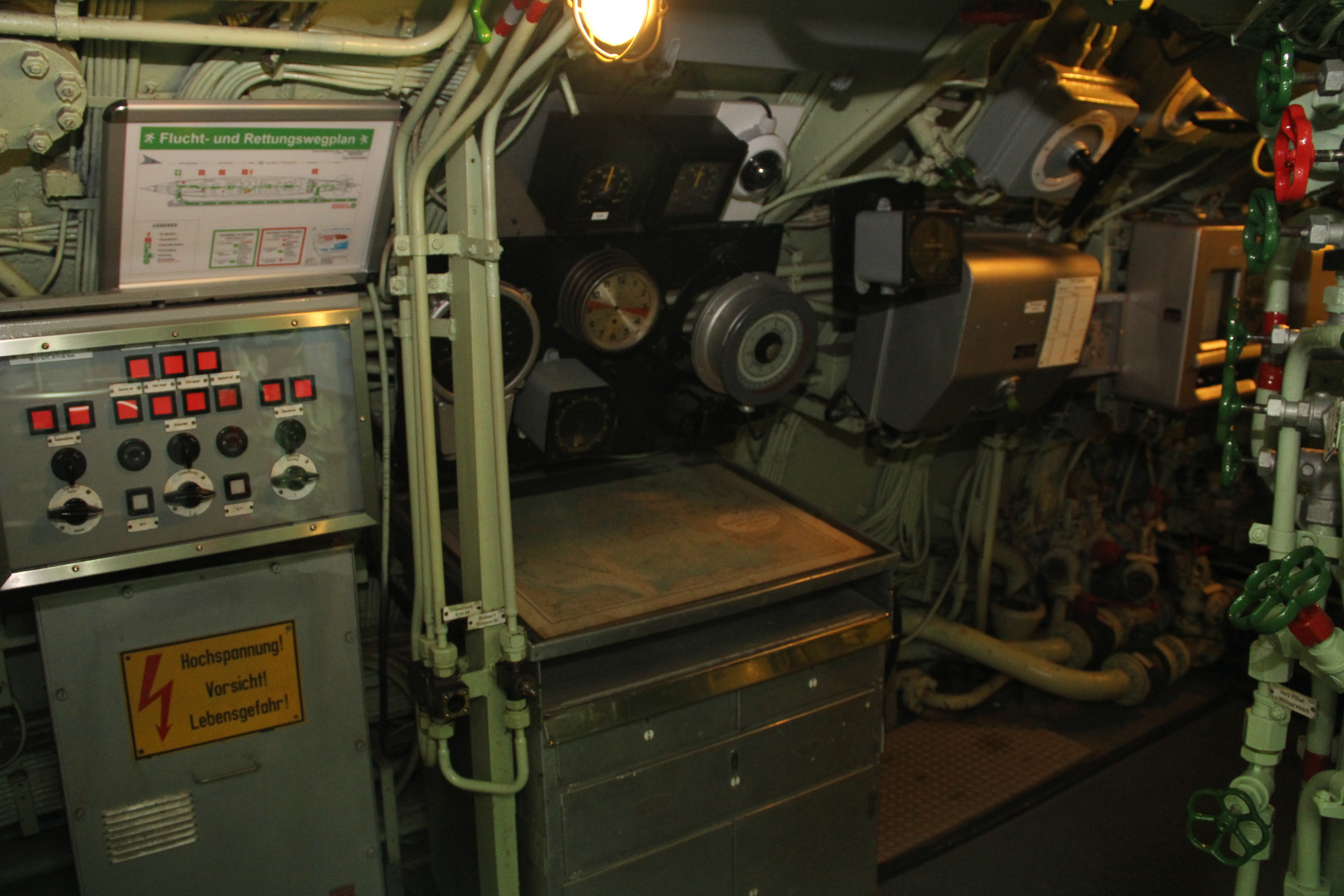

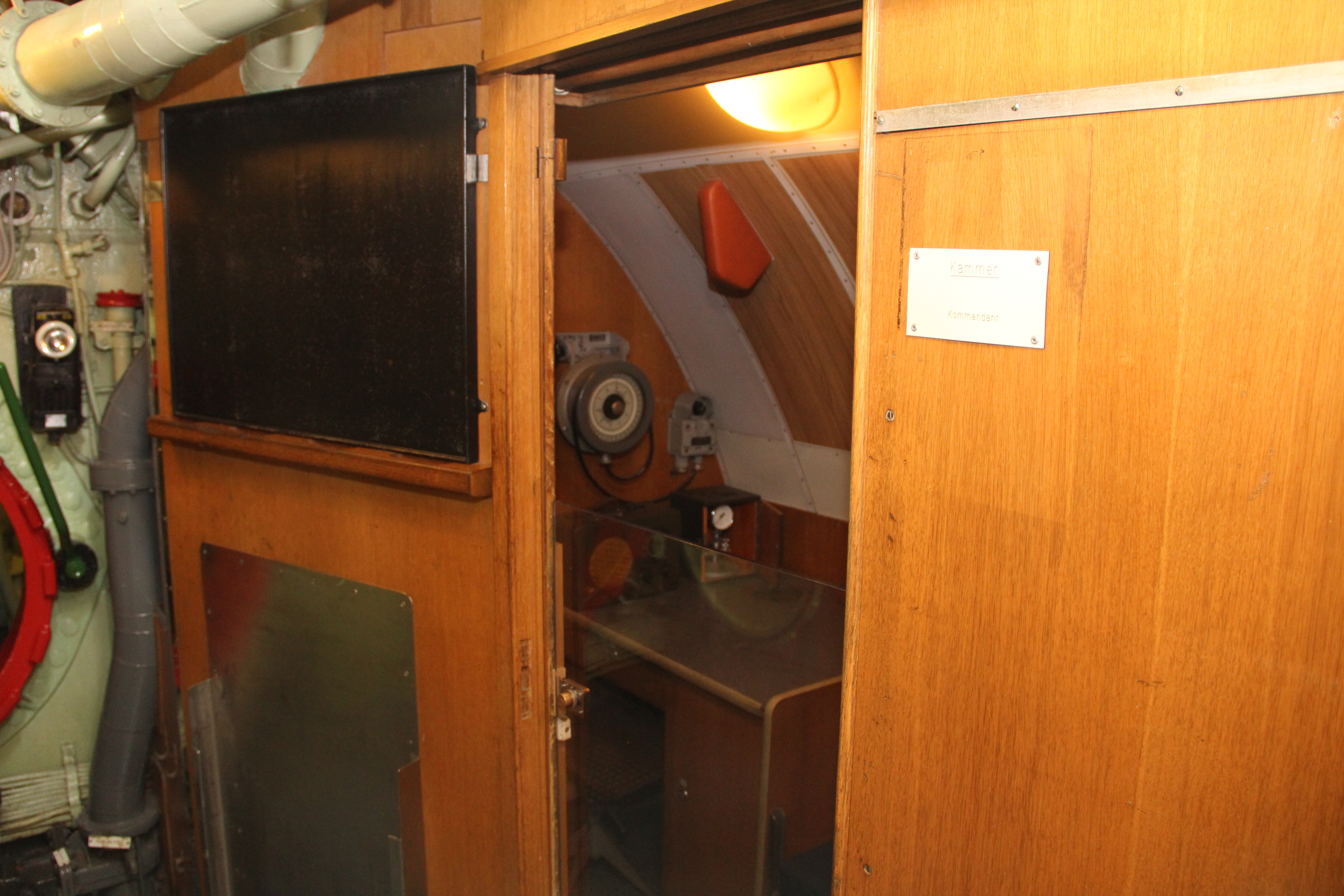

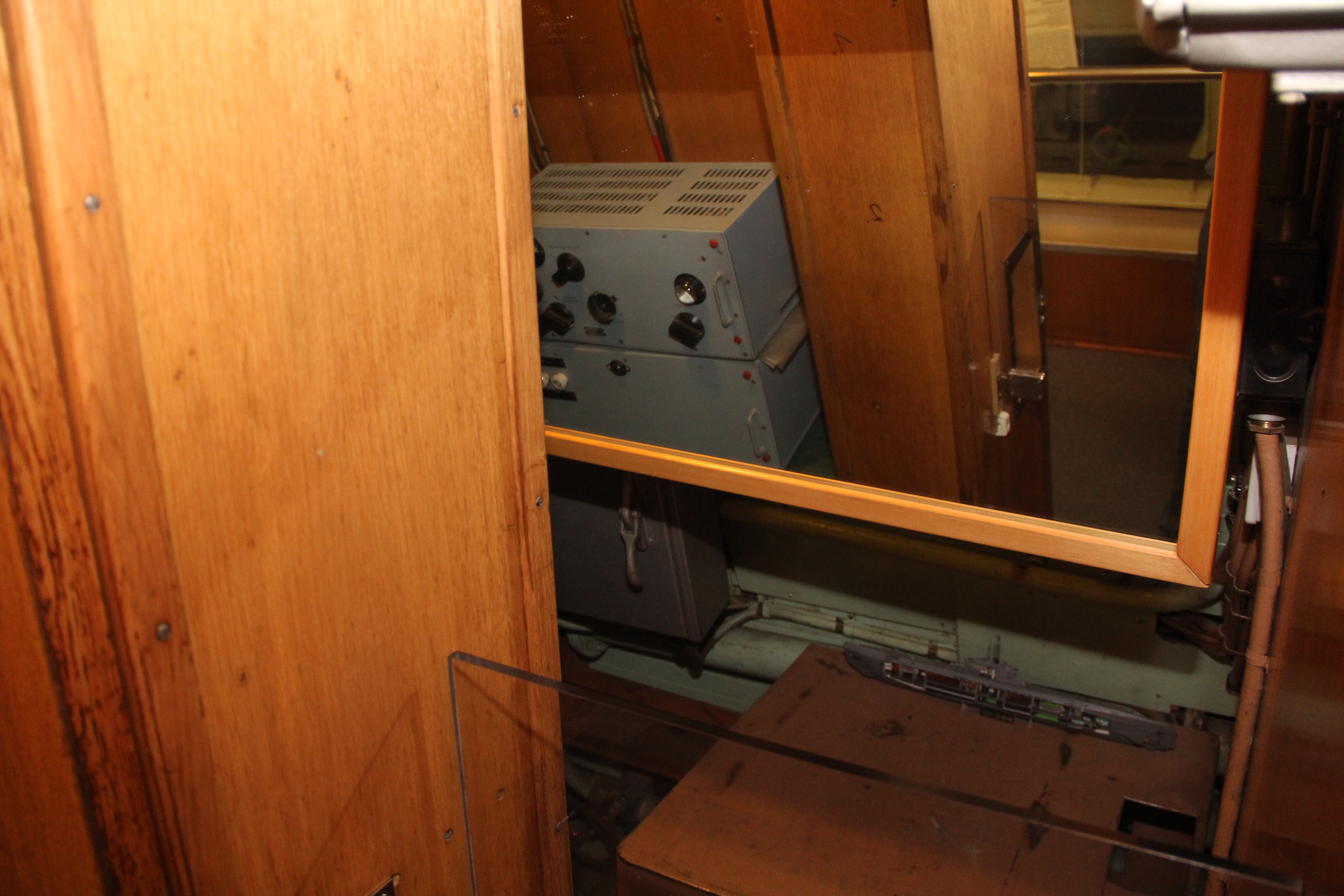

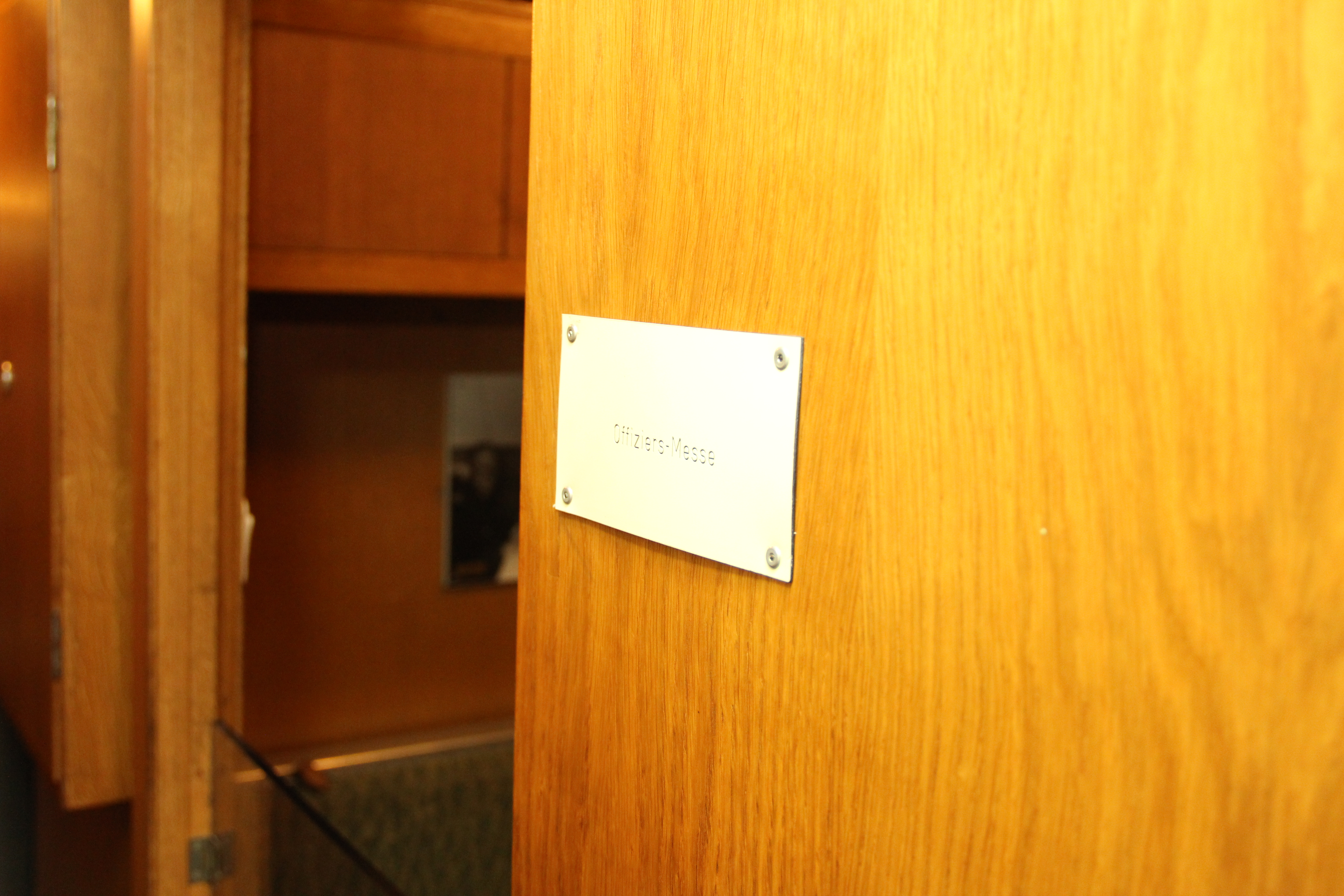

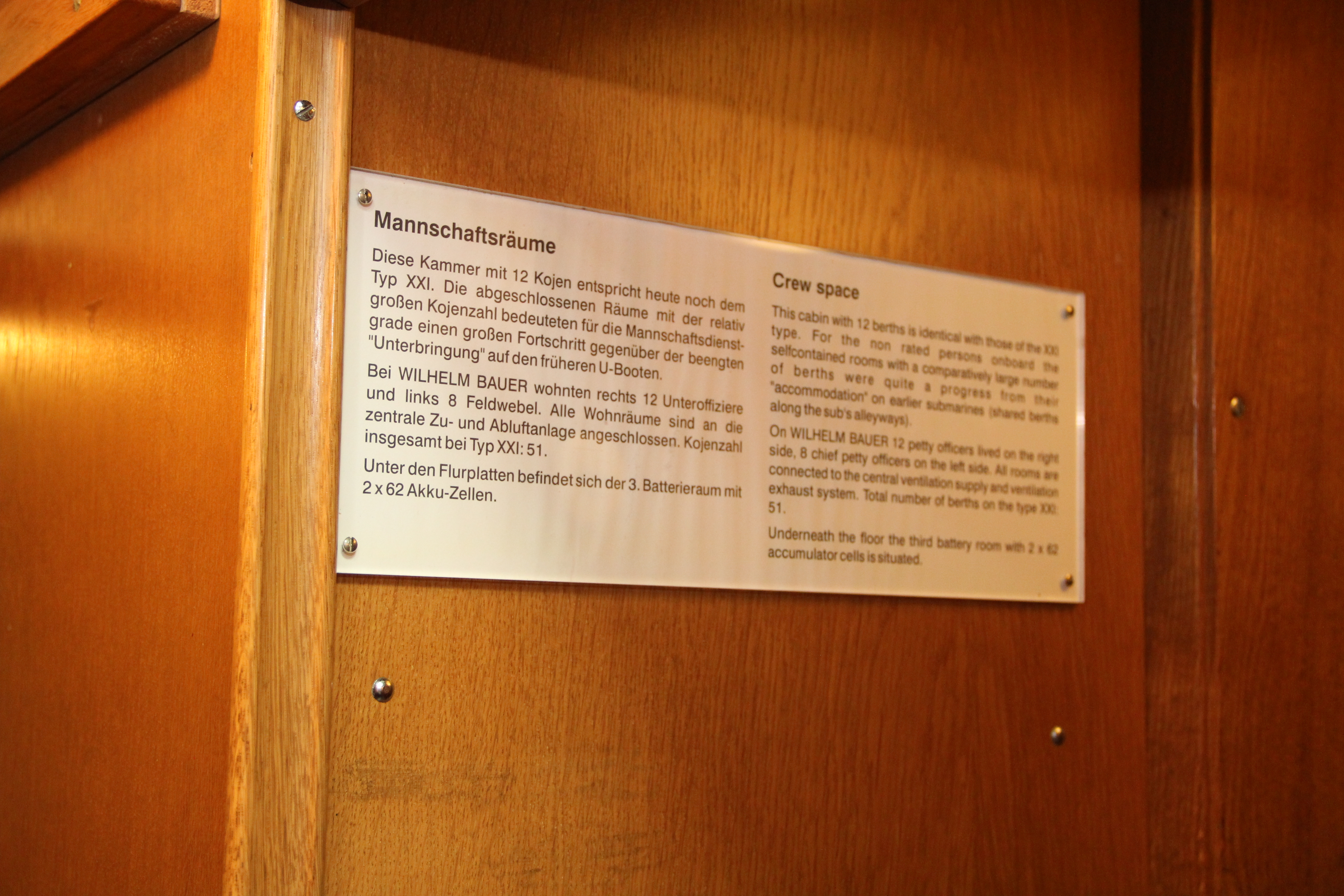

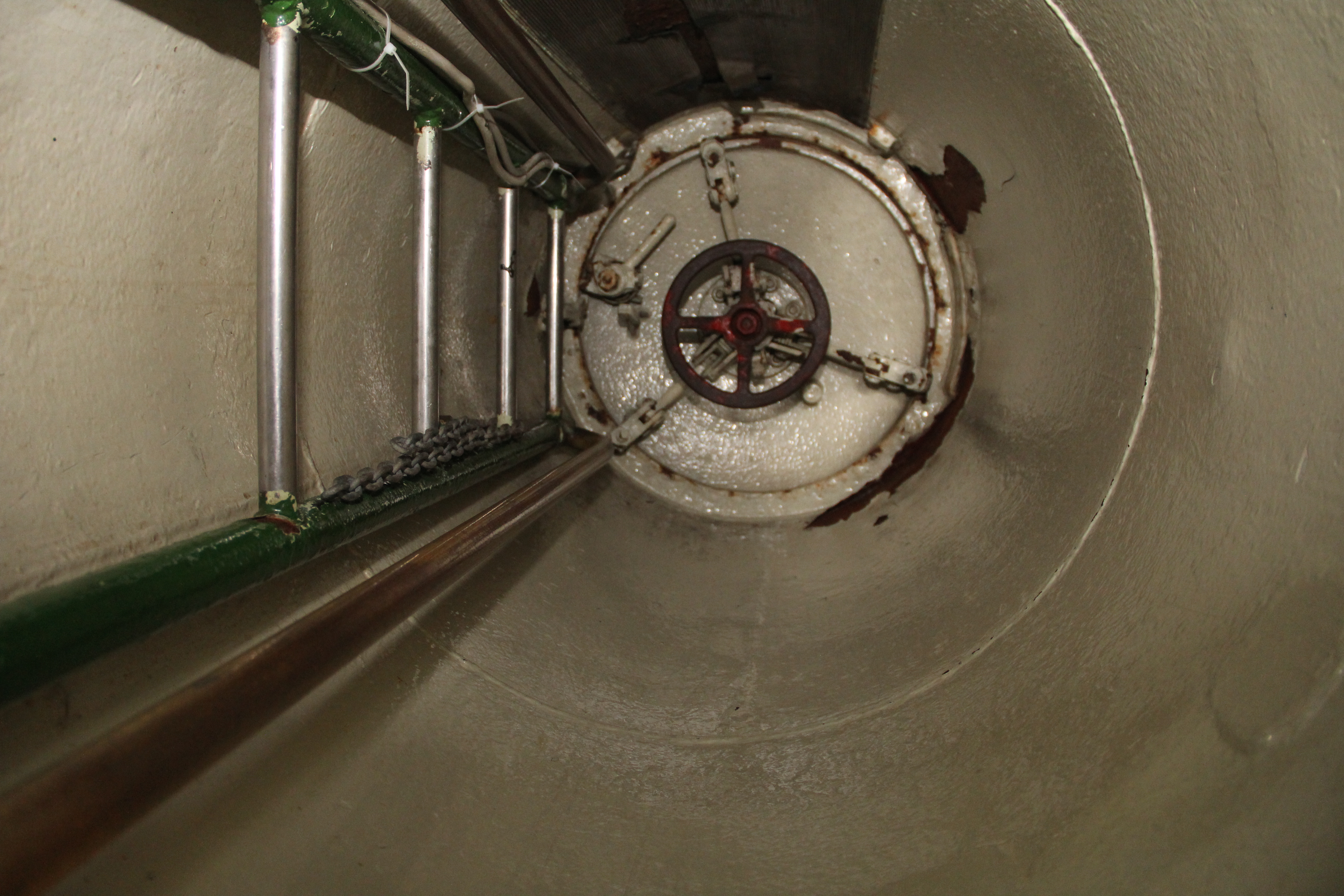

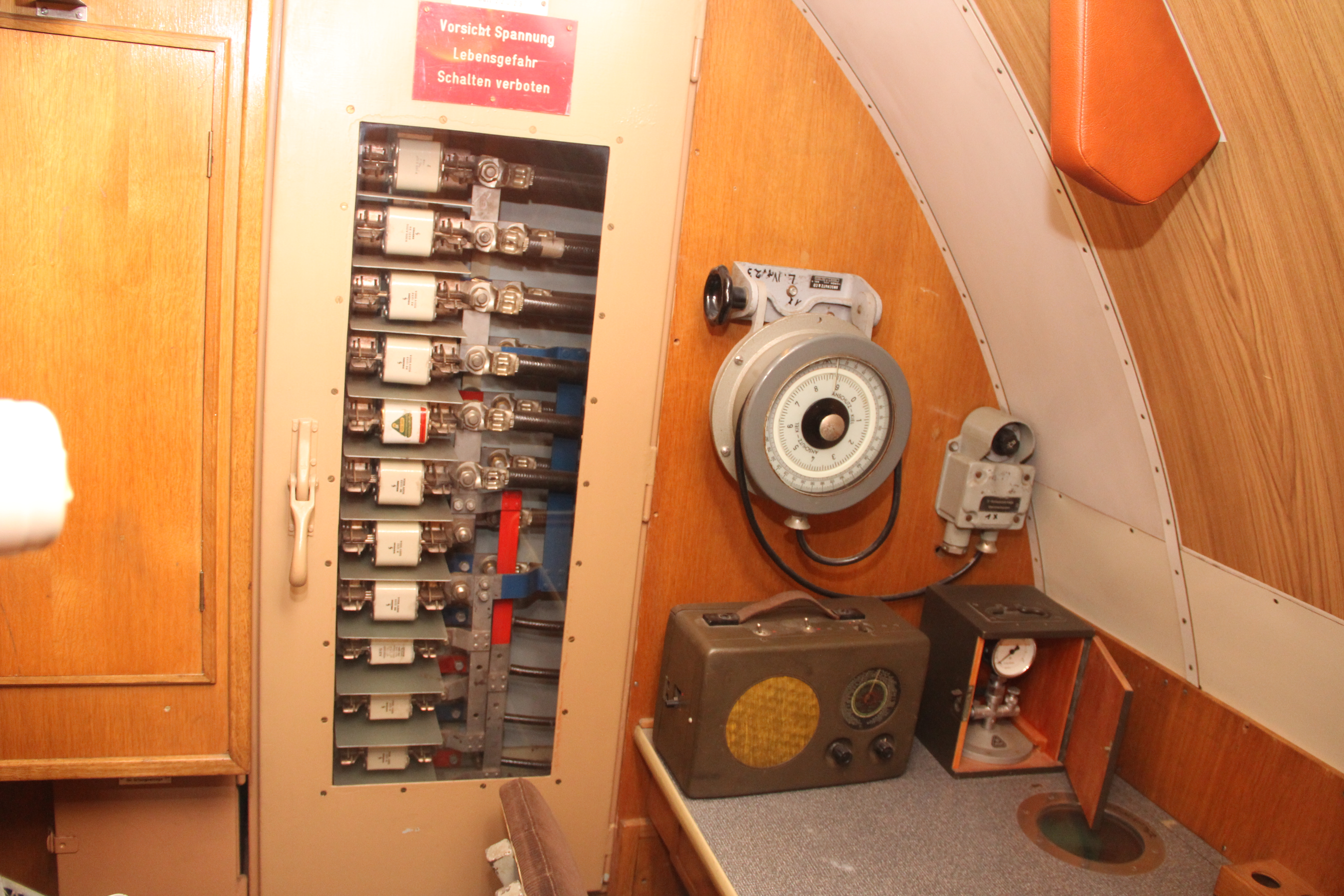

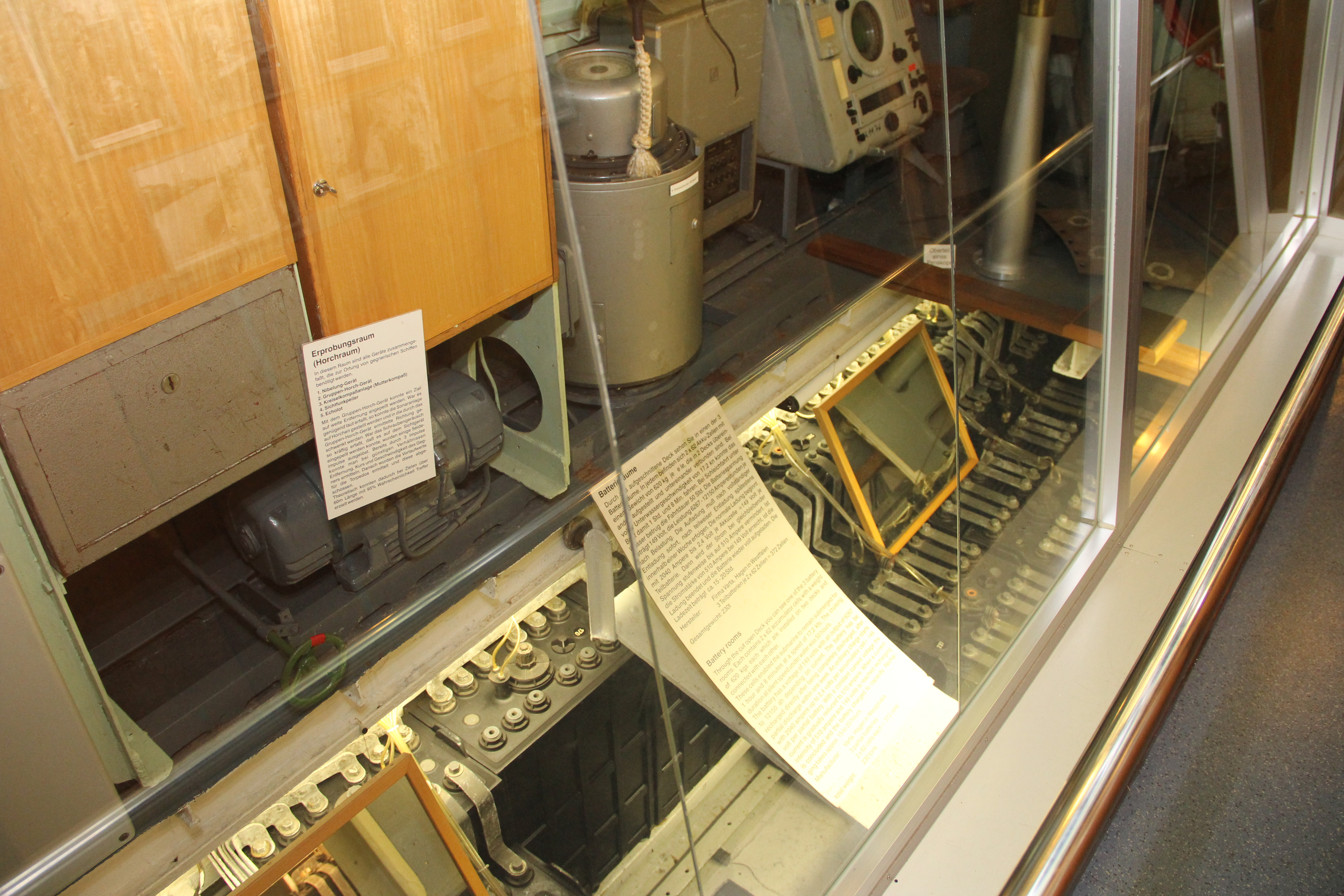

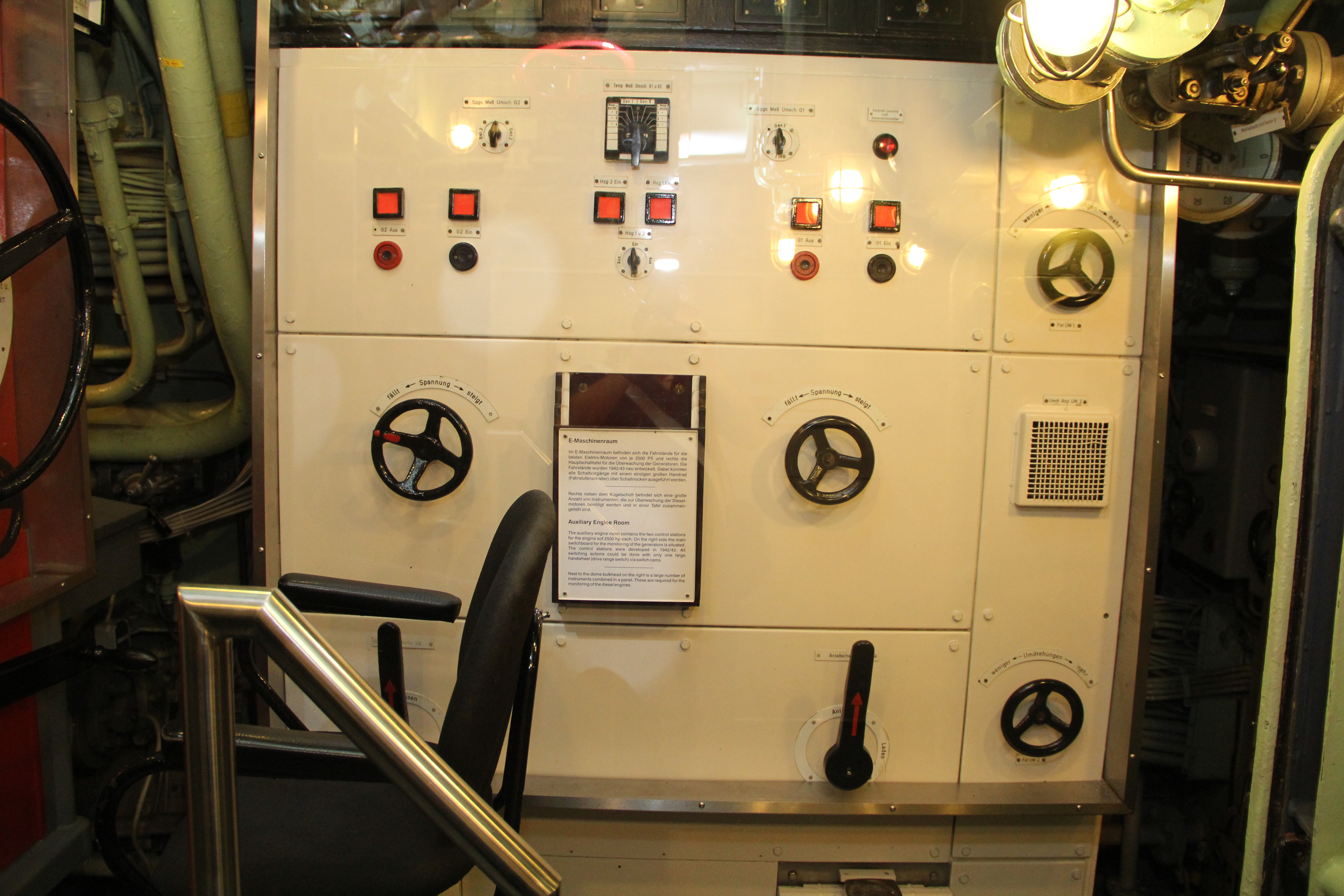

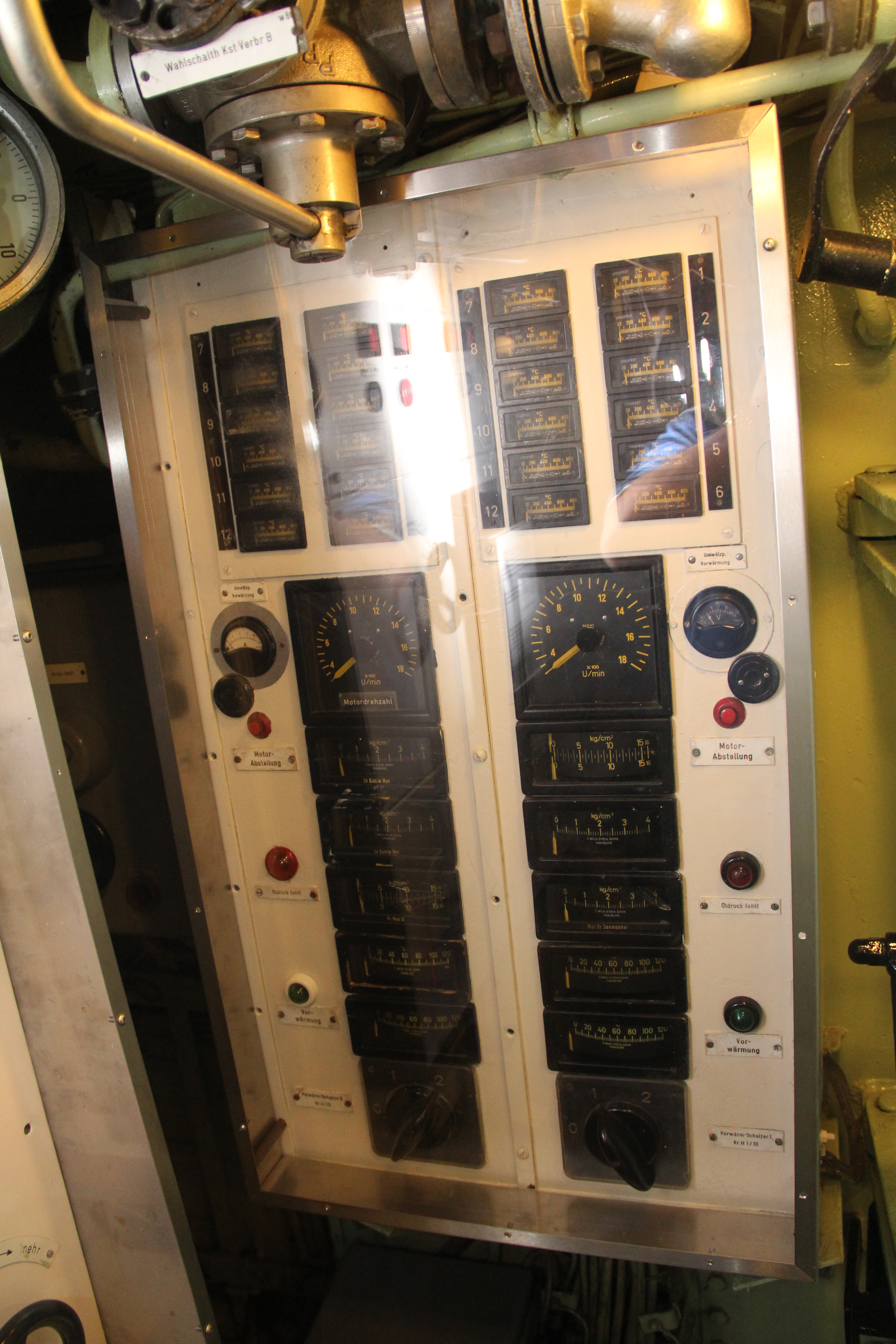

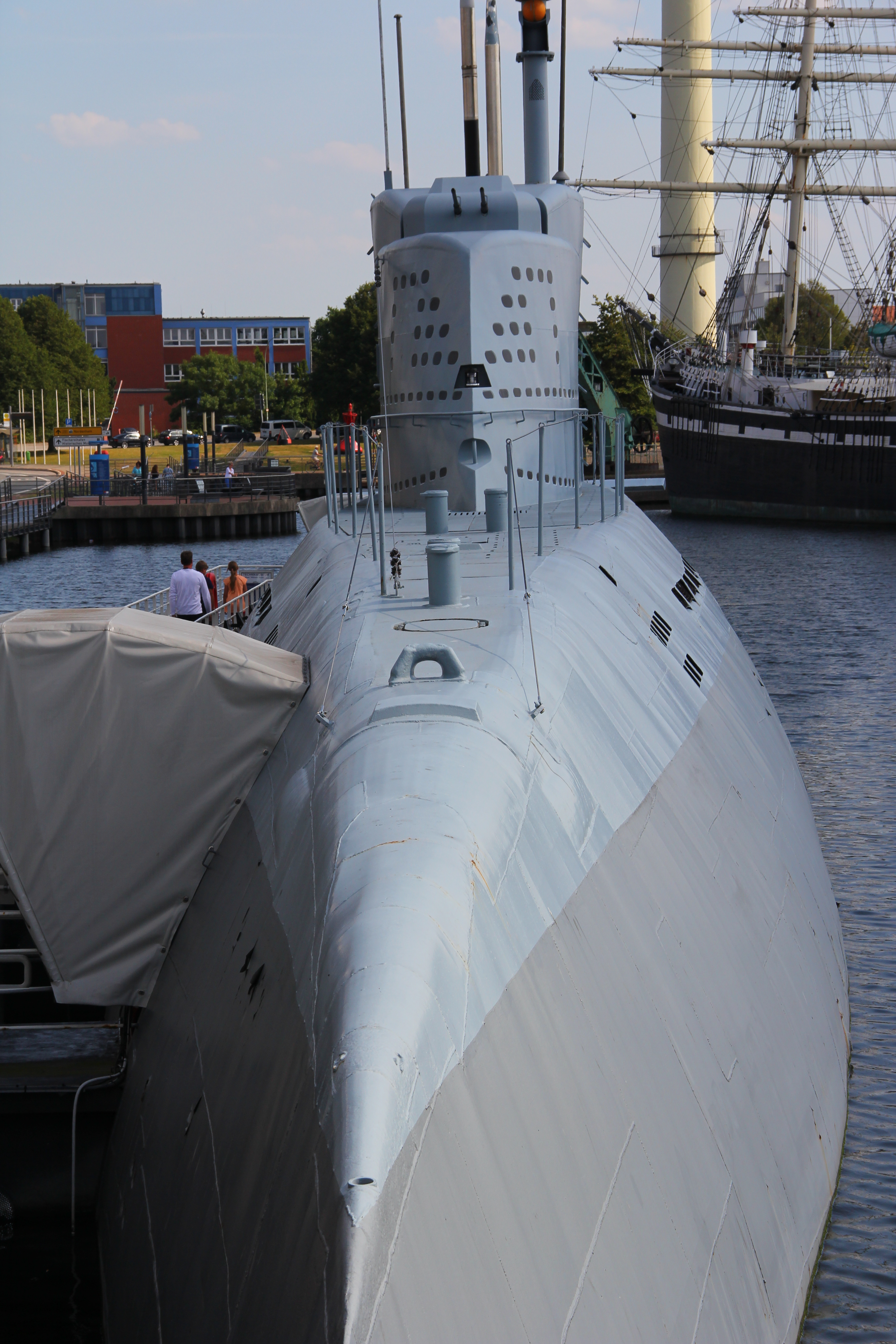

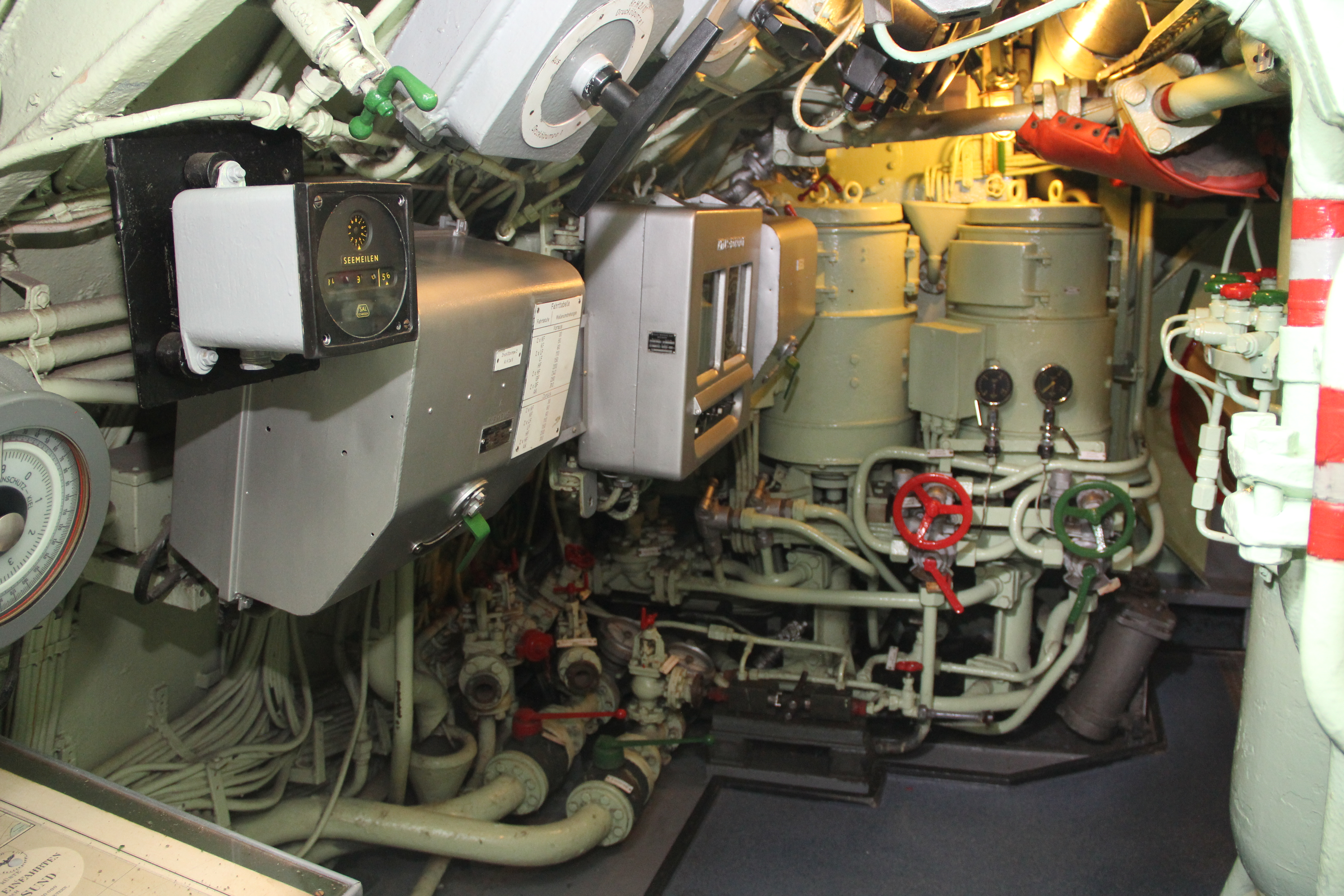

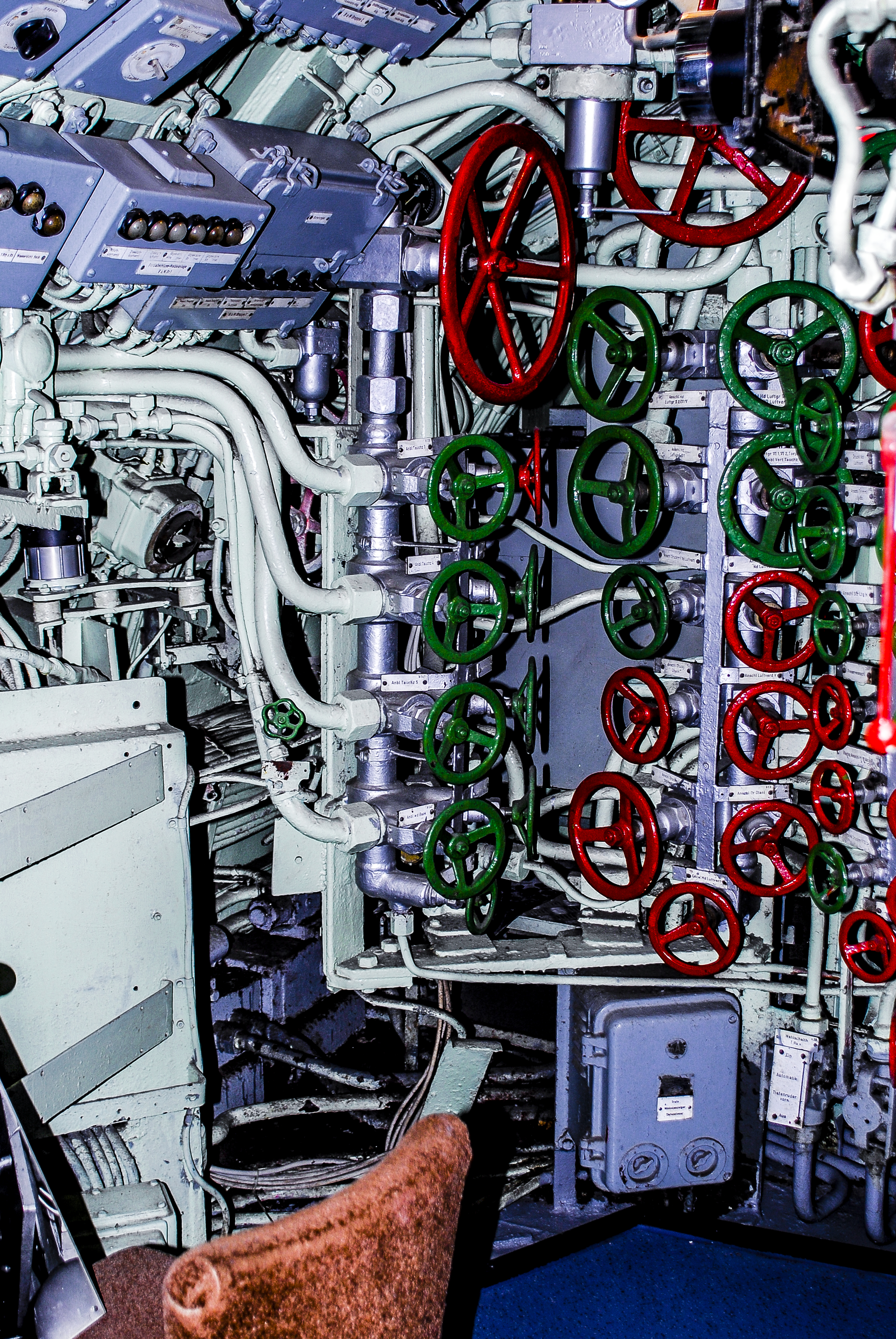

== Other surviving U-boats ==
- SM U-1
- U-505
- U-534
- U-995

== Bibliography ==
- Busch, Rainer; Röll, Hans-Joachim (1999). German U-boat commanders of World War II : a biographical dictionary. Translated by Brooks, Geoffrey. London, Annapolis, Md: Greenhill Books, Naval Institute Press. ISBN 1-55750-186-6.
- Busch, Rainer; Röll, Hans-Joachim (1999). Deutsche U-Boot-Verluste von September 1939 bis Mai 1945 [German U-boat losses from September 1939 to May 1945] (in German). Vol. IV. Hamburg, Berlin, Bonn: Mittler. ISBN 3-8132-0514-2.
- Gröner, Erich; Jung, Dieter; Maass, Martin (1991). German Warships 1815–1945, U-boats and Mine Warfare Vessels. Vol. 2. Translated by Thomas, Keith; Magowan, Rachel. London: Conway Maritime Press. ISBN 0-85177-593-4.
