= Hermann Howaldt =

German engineer and entrepreneur

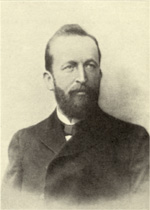
Hermann Howaldt (c.1883)

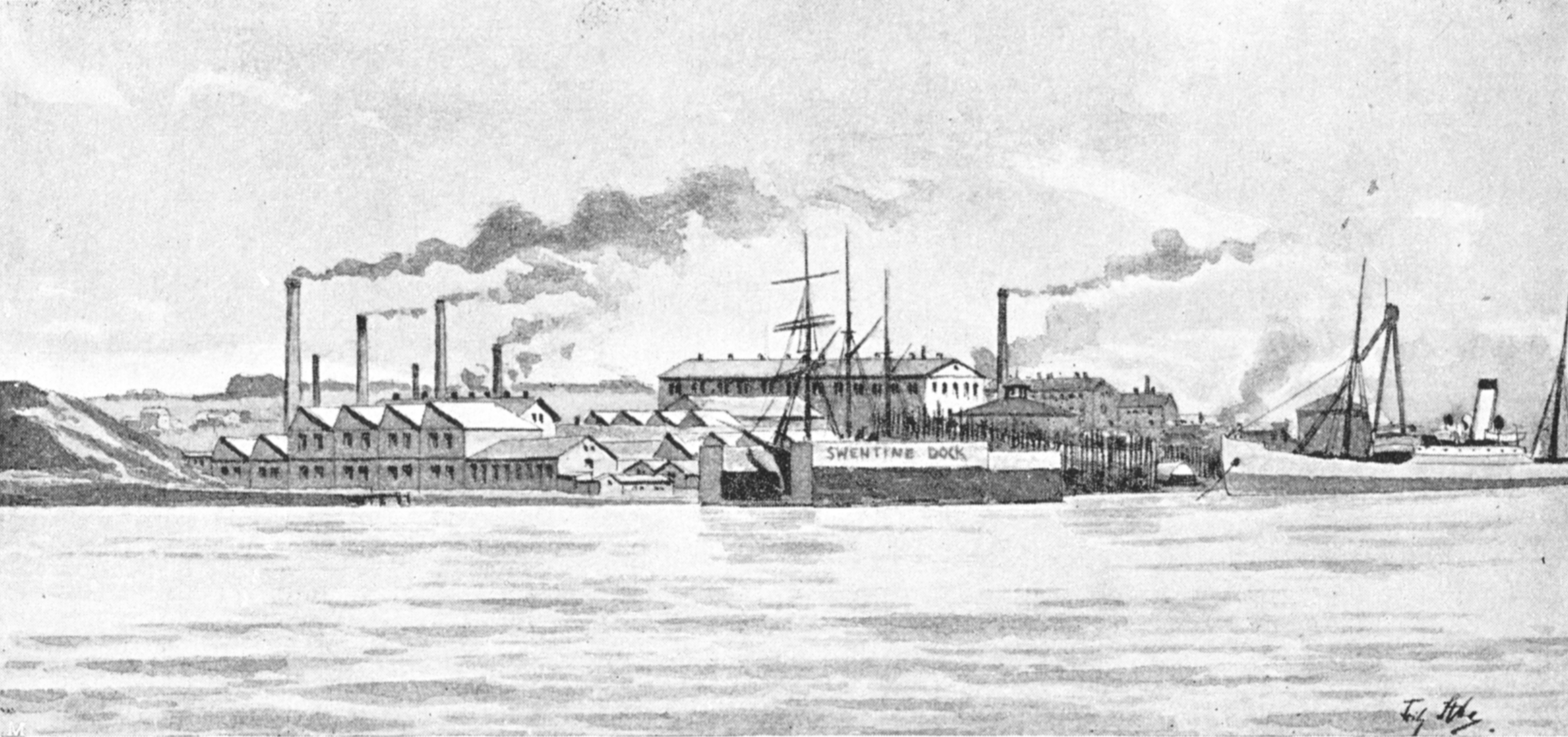
Howaldtswerke Floating Dry Dock; drawing by Fritz Stoltenberg (1895)

Hermann Howaldt (26 November 1852, Kiel - 17 May 1900, Kiel) was a German engineer and entrepreneur; co-founder and board member of "Howaldtswerke AG", now Howaldtswerke-Deutsche Werft (HDW).

== Life and work ==
After attending the Kieler Gelehrtenschule, he served an apprenticeship as a mechanical engineer at "Schweffel & Howaldt", with his father, August Howaldt. He then completed a formal study of the subject at the Technical University of Hanover.

In 1880, following August's retirement, he and his brothers, Georg and Bernhard, took over the company and changed its name to "Gebrüder Howaldt". he worked as the chief designer and, later, Operations Manager. When the company was incorporated as "Howaldtswerke AG" in 1889, he became a board member and Director of the machine factory. Just before his death, he was elected a member of the Kreistag (District Council) for the Landkreis Kiel. It is generally believed that he died from overwork.

He was married twice, to Emma Amalia Christiane, née Jungclaussen (1859-1885), and her sister, Maria Elisabeth Magdalena (1852-1930). He had five children, altogether. His son, Erwin, married Anneliese Scheibe, daughter of the mineralogist, Robert Scheibe.

In 2005, HDW became a division of "ThyssenKrupp Marine Systems".

In Kiel, at the mouth of the Schwentine, the site of the original shipyard is now occupied by the Industriemuseum Howaldtsche Metallgießerei, an old factory building that was reimagined as a museum, by the architect, Heinrich Moldenschardt.

== Sources ==
- Franz Maria Feldhaus (1905). "Howaldt, Hermann". Allgemeine Deutsche Biographie (in German). Vol. 50. Leipzig: Duncker & Humblot. p. 774.
- Christian Ostersehlte: Von Howaldt zu HDW. Koehlers Verlagsgesellschaft mbH, Hamburg 2004, ISBN 3-78220916-8.
- Hermann Howaldt In: Biographisches Lexikon für Schleswig-Holstein und Lübeck. Band 12, Neumünster 2006, ISBN 3-52902560-7, pps.214 ff.
- Wolfgang Zorn (1972). "Howaldt, Georg". Neue Deutsche Biographie (in German). Vol. 9. Berlin: Duncker & Humblot. pp. 665–666. (full text online).
