= August Howaldt =

German engineer and ship builder

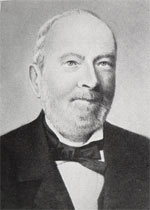
August Howaldt

August Ferdinand Howaldt (23 October 1809 – 4 August 1883) was a German engineer and ship builder. The German sculptor Georg Ferdinand Howaldt was his brother.

== Biography ==
Born in Braunschweig, the son of the silversmith David Ferdinand Howaldt, with whom he got his first practice working in metal, Howaldt made an apprenticeship in Hamburg and became a practical mechanicus.

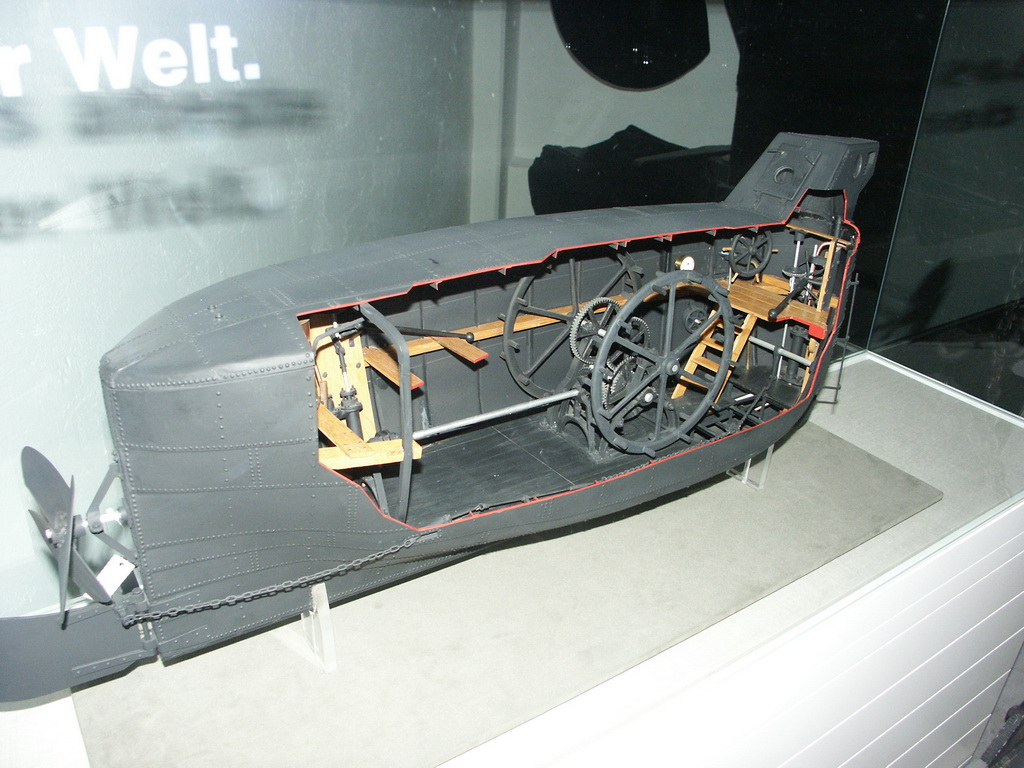
Model of the Brandtaucher.

In 1838 he moved to Kiel, where he married Emma Diederichsen. In Kiel he founded together with the Kiel entrepreneur Johann Schweffel the "Maschinenbauanstalt Schweffel & Howaldt", a company initially building boilers for industry and the new railroad companies in between Hamburg and Kiel and agricultural machinery for the surrounding estates in Holstein.

In 1849 Schweffel & Howaldt built its first steam engine for naval purposes for the Von der Tann, a gunboat for the small navy of Schleswig-Holstein, and the Brandtaucher, the first German incendiary diver or submarine designed by Wilhelm Bauer. The Brandtaucher is today an exhibit of the German Forces Military History Museum in Dresden. Schweffel & Howaldt also built two tugs in 1860 and 1864. When he passed his company to his sons Georg, Bernhard and Hermann Howaldt, who continued in 1879 under the name Gebrüder Howaldt. The firm merged with Georg's shipyard in Kiel in 1889 to become Howaldtswerke AG, today known as Howaldtswerke-Deutsche Werft (HDW).
