= Black May (World War II) =

Period during the Second World War

- Part of the Battle of the Atlantic
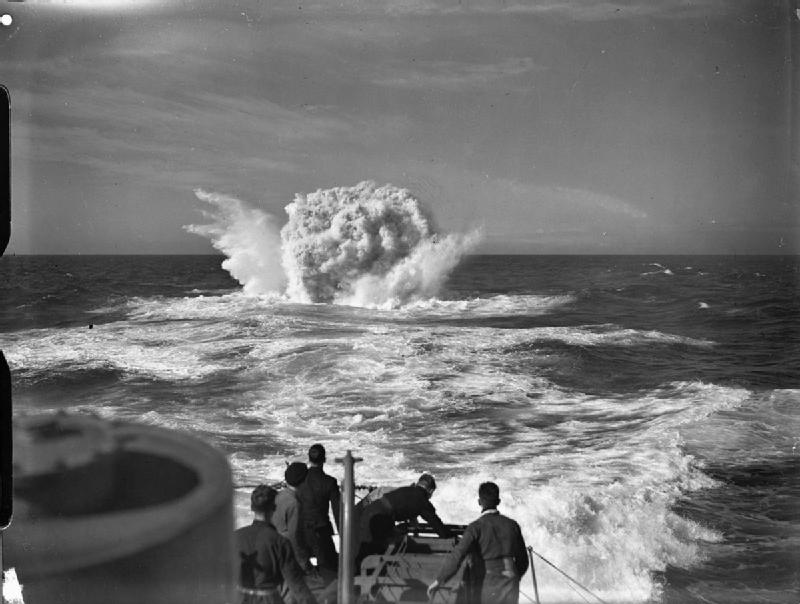
- Depth charges exploding from the destroyer HMS Vanoc during an Atlantic convoy in May 1943
Date	29 April – 24 May 1943
Location	Atlantic Ocean
Result	British victory

Belligerents
United Kingdom; Canada	Germany

Commanders and leaders
Max Horton; John Slessor	Karl Dönitz

Strength
Royal Navy; Merchant navy	Kriegsmarine U-boat arm

Casualties and losses
58 ships sunk	43 submarines sunk; 37 submarines damaged

Black May refers to May 1943 in the Battle of the Atlantic campaign during World War II, when the Kriegsmarine U-boat arm (U-Bootwaffe) suffered high casualties with fewer Allied ships sunk; it is considered a watershed in the Battle of the Atlantic.

== Background ==
=== March ===
After February battles around Convoy SC 118, Convoy ON 166 and Convoy UC 1, Black May was the culmination of the March–May 1943 crisis in the Battle of the Atlantic. The U-boat offensive reached its peak in March, with big convoy battles, first around Convoy HX 228, Convoy SC 121, and Convoy UGS 6; then followed the battle for Convoy HX 229/Convoy SC 122, the largest convoy battle of the war. Allied losses for March totalled 120 ships of 693,000 long tons (704,000 t) of which 82 (476,000 long tons (484,000 t)) were lost in the Atlantic. The U-Bootwaffe lost 12 U-boats. The official Royal Navy historian, Stephen Roskill, concluded, "The Germans never came so near to disrupting communications between the New World and the Old as in the first twenty days of March 1943".

=== April ===
Some respite for the Allies came in April, as Karl Dönitz, the Befehlshaber der U-Boote (BdU, commander U-boats) was unable to maintain as many U-boats in the Atlantic. Many of the boats involved in March had headed for their bases but the boats still operational in the month remained active. A particular shock at the end of April was the attack by U-515 on Convoy TS 37, which saw the loss of four tankers in three minutes and another three over the next six hours. Allied losses in April were 64 ships totalling 345,000 long tons (351,000 t); 39 ships (235,000 long tons (239,000 t)) were lost in the Atlantic. Fifteen U-boats were lost from all causes. In the following month, the strategic and tactical advantages swung to the Allies, where it remained for the rest of the campaign.

== Black May ==
U-boat losses by cause
Loss	No.
Ship	12
Shore-based aircraft	14
Ship-based aircraft	2
Ship + shore-based aircraft	4
Ship + ship-based aircraft	1
Submarine	1
Collision	2
Other causes	1
Missing	3
Bombing raid	3 (Note: 2 raised and re-commissioned)
Total lost	43

In May 1943, U-boat strength reached its peak, with 240 operational U-boats, of which 118 were at sea, yet the sinking of Allied ships continued to decline. The month opened with the battle for Convoy ONS 5, which was costly for both sides, with the loss of 13 merchant ships and six U-boats. The tactical improvements of the escorts began to take effect; the next three convoys that were attacked resulted in seven ships sunk and an equal number of U-boats. Five U-boats were sunk attacking Convoy SC 130, with Admiral Karl Dönitz's son, Peter, among those lost aboard U-954, while no convoy ships were lost.

During May there had been a drop in Allied losses, 58 ships of 299,000 long tons (304,000 t), of which 34 ships of 134,000 long tons (136,000 t) were lost in the Atlantic. This was coupled with a tremendous rise in U-boats sunk by the Allies which constituted the greatest monthly loss suffered by U-boat arm up to that time; 18 boats were lost in convoy battles in the Atlantic in the month, 14 were lost to air patrols; six of these in the Bay of Biscay. When including losses of boats in other theatres, accidents and other causes, the total loss to the U-boat arm in May was 43 boats which represented 25 per cent of the operational U-boats. May's losses was nearly three times the number of the previous highest, and more boats than had been lost in the whole of 1941. Equally significant was the loss of experienced crews, particularly the junior officers, who represented the next generation of commanders. Black May signaled a decline from which the U-boat arm never recovered.

On 24 May 1943, Admiral Dönitz, shocked at the defeat suffered by the U-boats, ordered a temporary halt to the U-boat campaign and withdrew most boats from operational service. The U-boats were unable to return in significant numbers until autumn but nonetheless never regained the advantage. Technological efforts and tactical changes were made over the next two years but the U-boats were never able to re-establish their threat to Allied shipping.

== Allied success ==
This change was the result of a combination of the sheer numbers of Allied ships at sea, Allied air power at sea, and technological developments in anti-submarine warfare. These had been introduced over the period and came to fruition in May, with devastating results. Operational analysis was used here, too, to improve the efficiency of attack methods and the weapons in use.

=== Escort tactics and weapons ===
The most important factor in the Allied success was that the escorts were getting better; escort groups were becoming more skilled and scientific analysis was producing better tactics which proved more effective against sinking U-boats than existing methods and weapons. For instance, the creeping attack pioneered by Captain "Johnnie" Walker utilized two ships; the first ship remained stationary and kept in ASDIC contact with the target U-boat at all times (which was in turn aware of the first ship), all while the first ship guided a second ship (not using ASDIC) slowly and silently towards the target's correct position to release depth charges. New weapons, the Hedgehog and Mark 24 FIDO Torpedo, were coming into use. According to Royal Navy statistics in World War II, depth charge attacks had a kill ratio of 60.5 to 1, the Hedgehog was much more effective at 5.7 to 1.

Since the start of the war, the most capable types of escorts were fleet destroyers and sloops, whose warship-standards construction and sophisticated armaments made them fast all-around ships but expensive for mass production and too valuable for convoy escorts. The most numerous type of escorts were corvettes, inexpensive vessels built to mercantile standards, originally designed for coastal patrol and pressed into service for mid-ocean anti-submarine warfare. Corvettes were manoeuvrable and seaworthy but slow and poorly armed. The US Navy designed a new type of escort vessel, the destroyer escort (DE) which could be produced more economically than fleet destroyers, while being faster and better-equipped than corvettes. The River-class frigates and Tacoma-class frigates were less capable than destroyer escorts but could be built in civilian shipyards, although the Tacoma-class vessels were only ready for front-line service in 1944 when they were no longer urgently needed.

More escorts became available from US shipyards and the return of escorts involved in the North African landings during November and December 1942. With the greater numbers of escorts to protect convoys, support groups were organised, to be stationed at sea instead of being tied to a convoy, as a mobile reserves to reinforce convoys under attack and to have the freedom to pursue U-boats to destruction rather than just drive them away.

The advantage conferred by Ultra, conversely, became less significant. Its value had been to enable convoys to be re-routed away from wolfpacks, but now the escorts could repel or destroy attackers. The Admiralty baulked at using convoys as bait, out of regard for Merchant Navy morale but there was considerably more safety in sailing through U-boat patrolled waters by mid-1943.

=== Air power ===
Land-based aircraft were used more effectively in driving off or sinking U-boats. The re-introduction of air patrols over the Bay of Biscay by long range Beaufighters and Mosquitoes, to attack U-boats as they came and went from base, began to take effect. The introduction of "very long range" aircraft, such as the Liberator, helped to close the air gap. They were ordered to engage only in "offensive" search and attack missions and not in the escort of convoys.

Convoys also enjoyed more consistent air cover, due to the introduction of merchant aircraft carriers (MAC ships) and escort carriers. MACs carried Swordfish TSR (torpedo, spotter, reconnaissance) aircraft and even if the Swordfish did not managed to sink a U-boat, their presence deterred or drove off U-boats as well as raising the morale of the merchant crews. Soon there were growing numbers of American-built escort carriers, which were considerably less expensive and quicker to build than fleet carriers, and while slower and lacking protection, these were sufficient for convoy escort. Escort carriers primarily carried Avengers and Wildcats. Rather than go through the Bureau of Ordinance, whose testing and quality assurance could take twelve months, aircraft mechanics on the escort carriers improvised to equip the aircraft for anti-submarine warfare, adding drop tanks to improve endurance and mounting UP rockets which could punch though a U-boat's pressure hull. MAC ships and escort carriers sailed with the convoys and provided much-needed air cover and patrols all the way across the Atlantic. Escort carriers and destroyer escorts worked as part of support groups which had the freedom to seek out U-boats since they were not tied to a convoy.

=== Numbers ===
The Atlantic campaign was a tonnage war; the U-bootwaffe needed to sink ships faster than they could be replaced to win, and needed to build more U-boats than were lost to avoid defeat. Before May 1943, even in their worst months, the majority of convoys arrived without being attacked, while even in those that were attacked, the majority of ships survived. In Convoy HX 229/Convoy SC 122, nearly 80 per cent of the ships arrived. At the start of the campaign, the U-bootwaffe needed to sink 700,000 long tons (710,000 t) per month to win; this was seldom achieved. Once the huge shipbuilding capacity of the US began, this target leapt to 1,300,000 long tons (1,300,000 t) per month.

U-boat losses had been manageable as German shipyards were producing 20 U-boats per month, while losses for most months prior to Black May were less than half that. What changed in May was that the U-bootwaffe lost 43 U-boats (25 per cent of the U-bootwaffe operational strength) a big defeat outstripping production that became commonplace until the end of the war.

== German tactical and technological response ==
The Germans introduced tactical and technological changes to turn the tide of the campaign, but neither was successful in reversing their fortunes and losses of U-boats continued. After May 1943, the rate of loss of U-boats was greater than the rate at which new boats were commissioned and the number of operational U-boats slowly declined.

The Germans tried to counter Allied air power by fighting on the surface rather than diving. When U-333 came under attack from an aircraft in March 1943, it stayed on the surface and shot down the aircraft. It was hoped that this success could be repeated if U-boats were given better anti-aircraft armament. Several U-boats were converted to flak U-boats. The appearance of flak U-boats initially gave Allied pilots a shock but they soon welcomed attempts by U-boats to stay on the surface. Additional defences against aircraft were offset by the U-boat having to remain on the surface longer, increasing the chance of the submarine's pressure hull being punctured. The U-boat gunners' effectiveness was limited by the lack of protection from return-fire and Allied pilots often called on escort ships to deal with flak U-boats. The extra anti-aircraft guns also caused drag when the U-boat was submerged. The U-333 incident had proved to be an exception and the experiment was abandoned after six months; the best defence for U-boats against aircraft remained diving.

In mid-1943, the Wanze (Bug) radar warning device and T5 Zaunkönig (Wren) torpedoes were introduced. Wanze was designed to give U-boats advance warning of aircraft by detecting radar waves so that the U-boats could dive before the aircraft could attack. The Zaunkönig torpedoes were designed to zig-zag in the hope that they would have a better chance of finding a target within a convoy. The Allies introduced the Foxer noisemaking decoy to defeat the acoustic homing device of the T5 torpedo. The Germans developed the T11 torpedo that was designed to ignore noisemaking decoys, but the war ended before it came into use.

The first U-boats fitted with snorkels (Schnorchel) went into service in August 1943. The snorkel was an extendable pipe that allowed U-boats to take in air without surfacing, allowing the U-boat's diesel engines to run when submerged. The snorkel suffered from technical problems and did not see mass use until mid-1944. Allied radar also became precise enough to pick up the snorkel.

The U-bootwaffe developed a radically new submarine design, the Elektroboot (the Type XXI and Type XXIII boats). Elektroboote did not need to surface during operations but the first Elektroboote were commissioned too late to see combat in the war.

U-boats started operations in distant waters like the Indian Ocean against targets less well-defended. Although the U-boats found fewer escort ships, there were also fewer merchant ships to sink. The far-away U-boats were called the Monsun Gruppe.
