= List of World War II torpedoes of Germany =

== List of World War II Kriegsmarine torpedoes ==
| Type | | Codename | Propulsion | Dia./length | Range (speed) | Warhead (pistol) | Notes |
| KM# | Type | Codename | Propulsion | Dia./length | Range (speed) | Warhead (pistol) | Notes |
|---|---|---|---|---|---|---|---|
| TI | G7a | | Wet heater | 533.4 mm / 7163 mm | 120 hm (30kn 'NS') / 75hm (40 kn 'WS') / 50 hm (44 kn 'SS') | Ka (Pi1), Kc (Pi3) | The standard torpedo prior to World War II, used by all platforms during World War II: surface combatants (Kreuzer, Zerstörer, T-Boote, S-Boote) and U-boats at night. Nicknamed "ato" by German crews (i.e. atem- or air-torpedo, indicating the steam propulsion) to distinguish it from the G7e (electric torpedoes). 44 kn speed was only used for S-Boote. According to certain sources only used from surface vessels during the last part of World War II. |
| TI Fat I | G7a | | Wet heater | 533.4 mm / 7163 mm | 120hm (30 kn) / 75 hm (40 kn) / 50 hm (44 kn) | Ka (Pi1), Kc (Pi3) | Standard TI with Fat program-control type I (for security-reasons only used by night). |
| TI Lut I | G7a | | Wet heater | 533.4 mm / 7163 mm | 120 hm (30 kn) / 75 hm (40 kn) / 50 hm (44 kn) | Ka (Pi1), Kc (Pi3) | Standard TI with Lut program-control type I. |
| TI Lut II | G7a | | Wet heater | 533.4 mm / 7163 mm | 120hm (30kn) / 75 hm (40 kn) / 50 hm (44 kn) | Ka (Pi1), Kc (Pi3) | Standard TI with Lut program-control type II. |
| TIü | G7a | | Wet heater | 533.4 mm / 7163 mm | <120 hm (30 kn) / <75 hm (40 kn) | Exercise head only (light) | Torpedo dedicated for educational/training purposes with Schulboote at U-Flotillen. It had restricted settings on depth mechanism, a light (empty) exercise head and other minor modifications, to ensure positive buoyancy at the end of the run and reduced stress on the engine (=less damages and loss of torpedoes, i.e. achieving a higher number of shots). |
| TIü Lut II | G7a | | Wet heater | 533.4 mm / 7163 mm | <120 hm (30 kn) / <75hm (40 kn) | Exercise head only (light) | TIü with Lut program-control type II. |
| TII | G7e | | Electric, lead-acid battery (13T) | 533.4mm / 7163mm | 50 hm (30 kn) | Ka (Pi1) | Faulty pistols. Nicknamed "eto" (electric torpedo) by German crews for easy distinguishing from the G7a ("ato" air-driven torpedo). Could not be fitted with Fat or Lut due to its short range. |
| TIII | G7e | | Electric, lead-acid (13T battery) | 534,6 mm / 7163 mm | 50 hm (30 kn) | Kb (Pi2) | Improved pistols and batteries (cable-guide from the battery-chamber to the warhead for powering magnetic pistols). Nicknamed "eto" (electric torpedo) by German crews for easy distinguishing from the G7a ("ato" air-driven torpedo). |
| TIII Fat II | G7e | | Electric, lead-acid (13T battery) | 534,6 mm / 7163 mm | 50 hm (30 kn) | Kb (Pi2) | TIII with Fat program-control type II. |
| TIIIa Fat II | G7e | | Electric, lead-acid (17T battery) | 534,6 mm / 7163 mm | 75 hm (30 kn) | Ka (Pi1), Kb (Pi2) | TIII with improved battery and Fat program-control type II. |
| TIIIa Lut I | G7e | | Electric, lead-acid (17T battery) | 534,6 mm / 7163 mm | 75 hm (30 kn) | Ka (Pi1), Kb (Pi2) | TIII with improved battery and Lut program-control type I. |
| TIIIa Lut II | G7e | | Electric, lead-acid (17T battery) | 534,6 mm / 7163 mm | 75 hm (30 kn) | Ka (Pi1), Kb (Pi2) | TIII with improved battery and Lut program-control type II. |
| TIIIb | G7e | | Electric, lead-acid (13T battery) | 534,6 mm / 7163 mm | 40 hm (18.5 n) | Kb2 (Pi2f) | TIII with only one battery compartment to reduce weight (special adaptation for use on Marder midget submarine). |
| TIIIc | G7e | | Electric, lead-acid (13T battery) | 534,6 mm / 7163 mm | 40 hm (18.5 kn) | Kb2 (Pi2f) | Improved TIIIb (special adaptation for use on Biber, Hecht, Molch and Seehund midget submarines). |
| TIIId | G7e | Dackel | Electric, lead-acid (17T 210 battery) | 534,6 mm / 11,000 mm | ca. 480 hm (9 kn) | Kb2 (Pi1d) | Special long-range anti-invasion torpedo with a variant of the Lut II program steering. Launched from S-Boote and barges (it saw operational use against the allied invasion-fleet in Normandy). |
| TIIIe | G7e | Kreuzotter | Electric, lead-acid (13T Special battery) | 534,6 mm / 7163 mm | 75 hm (20 kn) | Ke1 (Pi4c) | TIII specially adapted for use on Molch and Seehund midget submarines. |
| TIV | G7es | Falke | Electric, lead-acid | 534,6 mm / 7163 mm | 75 hm (20 kn) | Kd (Pi4a) | Simple acoustic homing. Only operational for a brief period before being replaced by the improved TV. |
| TV | G7es | Zaunkönig | Electric, lead-acid | 534,6 mm / 7163 mm | 57 hm (24 kn) | Ke1 (Pi4c) | Acoustic homing (three different type of seekers). Nicknamed "GNAT" by the allies (acronym from "German Naval Acoustic Torpedo). Generally regarded as the best German torpedo of World War II (between 5000 and 6000 launched, with a reported hit-rate of approximately 53%, a number that was considerably reduced after post-war analysis). TV torpedoes were modified to TXI from fall 1944. |
| TVa | G7es | Zaunkönig | Electric, lead-acid | 534,6mm / 7163 mm | 80 hm (21.5 kn) | Ke1 (Pi4d) | TV specially adapted for use on S-Boote (end-of-run detonation, reduced speed, longer range and different depth-mechanism). |
| TVb | G7es | Zaunkönig | Electric, lead-acid | 534.6 mm / 7163 mm | 80 hm (21,5 kn) | Ke1 (Pi4c) | TVa adapted for use as an anti U-boat torpedo. |
| TVI | G7es | | Electric, lead-acid | 534,6 mm / 7163 mm | 75 hm (30 kn) | Kf (Pi6) | TIIIa with minor changes (probably with Lut II) and a special warhead which was never fielded. |
| TVII | G7ut | Steinbutt | Walter turbine | 534,6 mm / ? mm | 80 hm (45 kn) | Kb (Pi2), Kf (Pi6) | Ingolin (peroxide)/dekalin/helman/water fueled BO VI-turbine. Combustion-chamber arranged horizontally in the longitudinal axis. Approximately 100 torpedoes produced, but never fielded - mainly due to several problems with both pistol and start ballistics. |
| TVIII | G7ut | Steinbarsch | Walter turbine | 534.6mm / ?mm | 80hm (45kn) | Kb (Pi2), Kf (Pi6) | Development of the TVII, with different internal organisation of the various mechanisms. More than 100 torpedoes produced. Was due to be fielded in April 1945, despite several problems during testing. |
| TIX | G5ut | Goldbutt | Walter turbine | 534.6 mm / 5490 mm | 40 hm (45 kn) | | "Goldfisch"-variant planned for the German "Kleinst-Uboote". As development of the U-boat ended, so did the program for the TIX. |
| TX | G7ef NYK | Spinne | Electric, lead-acid (13T battery) | 534.6 mm / 7163 mm | 50hm (30 kn) | Ka (Pi1) | Developed from the TII torpedo. Wire guided by means of visual sight from a command bunker / observation site. Intended for coastal defence and use from beach-batteries (wagenbatterie), later evolved to also include special harbour installations (molenbatterie) and mobile launchers (schiffbatterie). Only 200 torpedoes were built (gerät 43d), originally for 35 "spinne sperrbatterie" to be established on the French channel- and Mediterranean coastline from July 1944. Some batteries were also established in Belgium, and after the allied invasion in July 1944 most of the French batteries were moved to the Netherlands, Germany and Denmark (85 TX torpedoes were located in 14 Danish batteries after the war). |
| TXa | G7ef NYK | Spinne | Electric, lead-acid (13T battery) | 534.6 mm / 7163 mm | 50 hm (30kn) | Ka (Pi1) | A new version (gerät 43 cp) of the TX tested for use on midget submarines (Marder/ Molch/ Seehund) with good results. It was planned for operational use on the Seehund from August 1945. |
| TXI | G7es | Zaunkönig II | Electric, lead-acid | 534.6 mm / 7163 mm | 57 hm (24 kn) | Ke1 (Pi4c) | TV with improved acoustic homing and depth mechanism. Operational. About 90 torpedoes in stock by September 1944 (a combination of new torpedoes and the ongoing upgrade of existing TV), but no certain record of usage during the war (five TXI torpedoes were recovered from the U-534, now on display in Birkenhead, UK. Four of the TXIs were picked for parts and blown up. Only one torpedo remains on display with the U-boat). |
| TXII | G5e | | Electric, lead-acid (9T battery) | 534.6mm / 5550 mm | 30 hm (30 kn) | Kb (Pi2) | Short torpedo developed for the smaller type XVII coastal submarines. Was intended as a temporary solution until the ingolin-torpedoes were ready for operational use, but never fielded. |
| TXIII | G7ut | K-Butt | Walter turbine | 534.6 mm / 7163 mm | 30 hm (45 kn) | Kb2 (Pi2) | Ingolin/dekalin/helman/water fueled BO VI-turbine. Less fuel than the "Goldbutt", but 7 m length. Experimental development for the Seehund midget submarine. With sinker-mechanism. Approximately 60 torpedoes produced, planned for fielding by end of April 1945. |
| TXIV | G7a | | Wet heater | 534.6 mm (527 for airtank) / 7163 mm | 25 hm (34 kn) | Kc (Pi3) | TI with changed buoyancy (max air pressure reduced from 200 to 100 kg/cm^2) developed as a replacement for TIIIc (failing batteries) for use on the Seehund midget submarine. With sinker-mechanism. Never fielded. |
| | G7es | Lerche | Electric (13T 210 Special battery) | 534.6 mm / 7163 mm | unknown | Ke1 (Pi4c, TZ5) | Development of the TV and TX with both active acoustic seeker and wire guidance. An operator in an U-boat could listen to the signal from the seeker and manually control the steering. Never fielded. |
| | G7t | | Sauerstoff-turbine | 534.6 mm / 7163 mm | unknown | unknown (TZ2b, TZ5) | Experimental development of the oxygen-turbine. Dropped in favour of the ingolin-engines. |
| | G7m | | Kreismotor | 534.6 mm / 7163 mm | 270 hm (40 kn) / 180hm (48kn) | unknown (TZ2b, TZ6) | Experimental. Gasoline and compressed oxygen as fuel. Development was dropped in favour of the ingolin-engines. |
| | G7p | | Electric, with primary battery | | 91.5hm (30kn) / 36.5 hm (40 kn) | | Experimental, using two primary batteries (magnesium-carbon and zinc-leadoxide) for propulsion. It was proposed to get very good speed and range, but development ended due to lack of resources. |
| | M5 | | Wet heater | 736.6 mm / 4880 mm | unknown (40 kn) | unknown | Experimental torpedo developed for coastal defence with a very large explosive charge and long range. Based on the TI with a 6-cylinder engine and only one speed-setting. 14 torpedoes built with 6 spare engines. Testing proved numerous "bottom-runners" due to failure of the launch and general poor quality of design and production. Two torpedoes were recovered and prepared for transport to the U.S. Ordnance Investigation Laboratory as museum pieces, but whether this was executed is doubtful. |
| | G7es | Geier I and II | Electric | 534.6 mm / 7163 mm | unknown | | Active sonar homing, experimental. Similar to the TV. Development-program with Luftwaffe, which ended up going for the "Pfau" instead. Otherwise successful design, which led to planning of a further development ("Geier III"). |
| LTIm | F5b | | Wet heater | 450 mm / 5550 mm | 25 hm (40 kn) | GK3a (Pi51) | Luftwaffe F5b LTI torpedo adapted for use on Kriegsmarine Kleinstschnellboote. |
| | G7as | | Wet heater | | | | Acoustic homing, not fielded |
| | G7u | Klippfisch | Wet heater Walter turbine | | 95 hm (40 kn) | | Experimental intermediate model for the G7ut development (never planned for production). Ingolin/dekalin/Helman/Water-propulsion, using the aft-section and engine from the TI. |
| | G7ut | Schildbutt | Walter turbine with seawater injection | | 140 hm (45 kn) / 180 hm (40 kn) | | Experimental. Ingolin/dekalin/Helman/Water pressure-injection fueled turbine, later developed with the Steinwal-BO VI turbine. |
| | | Zaunbutt | Ingolin Walter turbine | | | | Acoustic seeker from the TV combined with the ingolin-propulsion. Proposed shorter range than the Steinbutt, due to losing space for fuel in favour of electronics for the seeker. The project was in model-testing phase, when all plans and models were destroyed in a bombing raid. The project was not continued. |
| | | Wal / Steinwal | Ingolin Walter turbine | | 192 hm (45 kn) | | Experimental. Ingolin/dekalin/water pumped to the motor combined with Helman pressure-conveyor (BO VI-turbine). Development nearly finished by end of the war. |
| | G7f NY | | Electric | | 12.5 hm (30 kn) | | Experimental surface-running torpedo remotely controlled by radio (several solutions were investigated, including control from airplane and shore-based relay-stations). Hexagon-shaped hull with hydrofoil wings and rocket-propulsion. |
| | G7m | | Closed-circuit propulsion | | 180 hm (48 kn) | | Considered as replacement for both steam and electric propulsion. Never fielded. |
| | G7d | | Oxygen-fueled wet-heater engine | | 120 hm (45 kn) | | In early stages of development by April 1945. German oxygen-torpedo of similar design as the Japanese Type 93 'Long Lance'. Based on the G7a(TI) (reusing the airtank, the waterchamber and the enginecompartment) combined with the turbine from the G7ut. Expected to have improved performance over the TI, with almost no bubbletrack. Also it would have superior safety for handling/storage on board, as well as less loss of energy over time in storage, compared to the ingolin-torpedoes. |
| | G7ur | Hecht | Walter rocket | | | | Experimental |
| | G7ur | Mondfisch | Walter rocket | | 700 hm (45 kn) | | Experimental. Ingolin/dekalin/floran-fueled rocket-engine (BO VI-Turbine). Transverse combustion-chamber. |
| | G5ut | Goldfisch | Walter turbine | 534.6 mm / 5490 mm | 34 hm (45 kn) | | 5 m version of the "Steinfisch". Planned torpedo for the "Spezial-Uboote", with development ending as the U-boats were never realized. |
| | | | Electric, lead-acid | unknown | unknown | | Two experimental torpedo models using the TIII engine, but replacing the conventional propellers with "schlagruder" (oscillating fins, similar to the tail of a whale). The hull was of an unconventional "manta" design, which had several benefits: Less drag in the water. Potential for much higher payload (a total weight of 4 tonnes using the TIII engine, compared to the 1.5 tonne total weight of the TIII). Much more stable travel compared to the traditional tube-formed torpedo hulls. One test model build. |
| | | Ackermann | unknown | unknown | unknown | | Wake-homing torpedo with acoustic/pressure seeker. Only theoretic planning. |
| | | Fasan | unknown | unknown | unknown | | Active acoustic-seeker with Lut-program steering. Lut program active until a ships wake is crossed/detected, upon the acoustic homing would be triggered. Only at planning-stage. |
| | | Ibis | unknown | unknown | unknown | | Active wake-homing acoustic-seeker. Project was dropped in favour of the "Fasan". |
| | | Märchen | unknown | unknown | unknown | | Magnetic seeker. Only theoretic planning. |
| | | Taube | unknown | unknown | unknown | | Low-frequency, passive acoustic seeker. Only theoretical planning. |
| | G7v | | Wet heater | 500 mm / 7083 mm | 120 hm (28,5 kn) | | Older torpedo developed in the early 1920s (prequel for the 21-inch G7a) which saw limited use during World War II. It was used at least until October 1944 in the Ofotfiord-batteries outside Narvik, and most likely for the rest of the war on some "schwimmende" batteries protecting the major German battleships in their bases in northern Norway. |
| | G/250 | | Wet heater | 450 mm / 7083 mm | 60 hm (27 kn) / 25 hm (36 kn) | | Older Whitehead torpedo (developed at the end of WW1), which saw limited use during World War II. For instance, it replaced older Norwegian torpedoes at two shore torpedo batteries on the west coast of Norway during the war (original torpedoes often failed due to conditions at the site, as well as a wish for an increased explosive charge). |
| | F5 | | Wet heater | 450 mm / 6505 mm | 15 hm (45 kn) | | Norwegian 45 cm torpedoes (beutewaffe) used at certain shore-based torpedo batteries in Norway, mainly the Whitehead Modell III. |
| | Horten torpedoes | | Wet heater | Various | Various | | Norwegian 45 cm and 53 cm torpedoes (beutewaffe + continued production at Torpedofabrik Horten during the war): The Modell VIII, VIIIb, IX, XI and XIb. |

=== Kriegsmarine torpedo designation system ===
The first letter indicates the diameter:

- G = 53 cm (21 in)
- F = 45 cm (17.7 in)
- H = 60 cm (23.7 in)
- M = 75 cm (30 in)

The number indicates the approximate length (for example, the length of the TI is 7163 mm):

- 7 = 7 m
- 6 = 6 m
- 5 = 5 m

Next letter(s) indicates specific features regarding propulsion and control:

- a = Atem, i.e. Pressluft/Dampfgemisch-Antrieb (pressurized air/steam - "wetheater" - engine)
- e = Elektrischer Antrieb (electric engine)
- f = Fernlenkung (remote control by radio or cable)
- d = Sauerstoff/Dampfgemisch-Antrieb (oxygen/steam engine)
- p = Primärbatterie-Antrieb (primary battery propulsion)
- m = Verbrennungsmaschine mit Kreislaufverfahren (combustion engine recirculating air)
- u = Sauerstoffträger Ingolin spurenfreier Antrieb (oxygen/steam engine with hydrogen peroxide as source for air, and no exposing "bubbletrack")
- x = Torpedo mit 3-Achsen Steuerung (3-axes control)
- r = Raketen- oder Düsenantrieb (rocket- or jet propulsion)
- s = Schall, Torpedo mit akustischen Suchkopf (acoustic seeker)
- t = Turbinenantrieb (turbine-engine)

"r" and "t" were only used with "u" to further denote the features of the ingolin-torpedoes. Some sources claim that "s" only was used with "a" to denote the development of G7a with acoustic seeker-capability; however, it was no doubt used for the electric torpedoes with acoustic seekers (as "es" or just "s").

When the torpedo reached production status and was fielded (i.e. for operational use), Kriegsmarine gave it a short designation "T", or "Torpedonummer", with the number given in Roman lettering (TI, TII, TIII, TIV, etc.). For different versions of the main torpedo, a small Arabic letter was added (for example TIIId, TVa etc.) denoting changes from the main design.

==== Warheads ====
Warheads were designated with the letter "K" (K = short for Kopf, meaning "head") and a small Arabic letter, with an additional number denoting variants of the head (for instance changing the material composition from bronze to steel, adding/removing spants during the course of the war or the method of installing the explosives). Examples: Ka, Ka1, Kb, Kb1, etc.

The explosive charge of warheads in German torpedoes during WW2, were different compositions of the Schießwolle (SW) that consisted mainly of a mixture of Trinitrotoluene (TNT) and Hexanitrodiphenylamin (HND):

- Schießwolle 18: 60% Trinitrotoluol, 24% Hexanitrodiphenylamin, 16% Aluminumpowder
- Schießwolle 36: 67% Trinitrotoluol, 8% Hexanitrodiphenylamin and 25% Aluminumpowder
- Schießwolle 39: 45% Trinitrotoluol, 5% Hexanitrodiphenylamin, 20% Aluminumpowder, 30% Ammonium Nitrate
- Schießwolle 39a: 50% Trinitrotoluol, 10% Hexanitrodiphenylamin, 35% Aluminumpowder, 5% Ammonium Nitrate
- Schießwolle xx (unknown): 0.6% Trinitrotoluol, 40% Aluminumpowder, 31.4% Ammonium Nitrate, 5.9% Sodium Nitrate, 2.3% Potassium Nitrate, 9.7% Cyclonite, 10.1% Ethylene Diamine Dinitrate

A total of 41 different types of explosive charges were used in German underwater ordnance, all given a "S"-number (1-41) for identification (only those relevant for torpedoes are listed here):

- S1 = SW 18 (solid consistency)
- S2 = SW 36 (solid consistency)
- S3 = SW 39 (solid consistency)
- S4 = Combination of S2 and S3 (solid consistency)
- S5 = Combination of S1 and S3 (solid consistency)
- S16 = SW xx (described as a "lumpy" consistency)
- S17 = SW 39a (solid consistency)
- S18 = Combination of S16 and S17 (easy liquefiable consistency)

List of Kriegsmarine warheads with weight/type of explosive charge:

- Type Ka: 295 kg/S2 (pre-WW2 head, not produced after ca 1941)
- Type Ka 1: 297 kg/S3 or S4 (in service from June 1942 to August 1943)
- Type Ka 2: 293 kg/S3, S4 or S18 (in service from August 1943)
- Type Kb: 282 kg/S2 or S18 (in service from September 1942)
- Type Kb 1: 282 kg/S18 (in service from February 1944)
- Type Kc: 260 kg/S2 (in service from March 1943)
- Type Kc 1: 256 kg/S2 or S18 (in service from October 1943)
- Type Kc 2: 256 kg/S18 (in service from May 1944)
- Type Ke: 274 kg/S2 (in service from July 1943)
- Type Ke 1: 274 kg/S2 or S18 (in service from February 1944)
- Type Kf: Unknown weight, but probably similar to the type Ke/S18 (in service from April 1944)

==== Pistols ====
Pistols used the "Pi" designations to begin with (Pi = short for pistole). The early models were named according to function and/or torpedo type like "PiG7H" or "PiG7A-MZ", but this was later replaced with a simple system of numbers, like "Pi1", "Pi2" etc.

To indicate variants within the main design, a small Latin letter was added after the number, like "Pi1a", "Pi1b" etc.

At some point, "Pi" was dropped for pistols with combination of mechanical (direct hit) and magnetic (influence) mechanisms, to the "TZ" designation (TZ = Torpedo-Zündeinrichtung). For example, the mechanical mechanism from the "Pi1" pistol combined with the magnetic mechanism from "Pi2" became the "TZ2".

The main booster charge used in German pistols was Pentrite, typically 300 g.

The following torpedopistols reached operational status with Kriegsmarine during WW2:

- Pi G7A-AZ: Mechanical igniter with short whiskers (replaced by Pi1)
- Pi G7A-MZ: Combined mechanical and (faulty) magnetic igniter (replaced by Pi2)
- Pi Typ 3F (later renamed Pi40): Copy of the British Type 3F pistol
- Pi G7H (later renamed Pi1): Mechanical igniter - most common pistol used besides Pi2
- Pi1a: Pi1 with netcutter
- Pi1b: Mechanical igniter with pendulum, rather than whiskers (not successful)
- Pi1c: Improved Pi1a
- Pi1d: Special version of the Pi1c for the TIIId "Dackel" torpedo (waterflap-safety replaced by a manually pulled safetypin, due to the torpedo's extremely low speed)
- Pi2: Mechanical igniter from Pi1 with an additional magnetic igniter
- Pi2a: Pi2 with netcutter
- Pi2c: Special variant of the Pi2a with its own battery for the low-speed TIIIb torpedo
- Pi2d: Improved variant of the Pi2c for torpedoes with low speed (TIIIb and TIIIc)
- Pi2e: Variant of the Pi2a with pendulum for the mechanical igniter, used for TIIIb and TIIIc torpedoes
- Pi2f: Variant of the Pi2d for low-speed TIIIb and TIIIc torpedoes
- Pi2 EDS: Pi2 with "endstreckendetonierersicherung" - a feature to ensure the torpedo did not detonate if missing the target
- TZ2: Combination of Pi1 and Pi2 used for torpedoes with low speeds below 30kn
- Pi3: Italian pistol - similar in function to the Pi2, but a different construction
- Pi3a: Variant of the Pi3, similar to the Pi1a
- Pi3c: Pi3 with netcutter
- PiSic (later renamed TZ3): Italian-constructed passive magnetic igniter combined with the mechanical igniter from the Pi3. Only used for G7a(TI) and G7a(TXIV)
- TZ3a: Improved German variant of the PiSic.
- TZ3b: TZ3a with improved induction-coil for the magnetic igniter
- Pi4: New pistol for heads with front-mounted acoustic seeker – i.e. the TIV, TV and TIX (mounted on top of the head with a pendoulum-based mechanical igniter and a separate active magnetic igniter)
- Pi4a: Pi4 with improved mechanical igniter
- Pi4b (also designated Pi DWK): New design of the mechanical igniter by Deutsche Werke Kiel (hence "DKW")
- Pi4c: Mechanical (pendolum) igniter (only used in the TZ5).
- Pi4c EDS (later renamed Pi4e): Pi4c with the EDS-function from the Pi2 EDS
- Pi4d SZE: Pi4c with "selbstzerstörungseinrichtung" - a function to ensure that the torpedo would detonate after missing a target, i.e. the opposite of EDS
- Pi5 (later renamed TZ5): Combination of Pi4c and a new active magnetic igniter (sender in head, receiver in tail)
- Pi6: New pistol ready for operational use with the TVI and TVII (ingolin) torpedoes. Based on the Pi3
- Pi6a: Pi6 improved with parts of the Pi1a
- TZ6: Mechanical igniter from the Pi6 and a new active magnetic igniter (sender in head, receiver in tail)

==== Code names ====
Code names were intended to be used only through the development period for security measures. However, in some cases they remained after the torpedo was fielded and had been designated with a "T"-number.

Torpedo pistols, program seeker-systems and other special arrangements also had their own "system" of code names, using the names of birds, fish or animals (for example Pi "Leuchtfisch", GA "Specht", seeker "Storch", control "Viper", target detector "Salamander" etc.). During development, the pistols were often given code names designated by the industrial developer or manufacturer. Generally, these consisted of simple words, syllables, or names associated with the firm or the engineers in charge of the pistol's development (for example Pi "Otto", Pi "Atlas", Pi "Berlin" etc.).

=== Program steering ===
Program steering was accomplished by a mechanical device ("Federapparat") coupled to the torpedo's gyroscope to alter its course in various pattern. Two main types was fielded during WW2: "Fat" and "Lut".

Fat ("Flächenabsuchender Torpedo"): Changed the torpedo's course over time so that it ran various patterns. Three versions: Fat I, II and III (Fat III was later redesignated Lut I).

Lut ("Lageunabhängiger Torpedo"): Similar to Fat, but changed the torpedo's course to a preset heading directly after launch, so the launching platform could fire torpedoes at targets without changing its own course. Two versions: Lut I and Lut II (+ a special Lut I variant for the TIIId torpedo with a very long initial straight run of 36000 m).

The Fat or Lut mechanisms initiated control of the gyroscope after an initial (preset) straight running distance.

Fat I ("S-shaped" loop-patterns): The initial straight distance could be set from a minimum of 500 m to a maximum of 1500 m. Two loop-patterns were available: "short" and "long", and in addition, there was a choice of right or left turns (i.e. a total of 5 settings on the Fat-mechanism). For "short" loops, the straight distance between turns was 800 m, with a total width of the pattern-search of 1140 m For "long" loops, the straight distance between turns was 1500 m, and a total width of the pattern-search of 1840 m. The turning radius for both patterns was 170 m.

Fat II ("S-shaped loops or circular patterns): The same as Fat I, but with an additional choice for "circular pattern", where the torpedo would run in a circle after the initial straight-run. This was an option primarily used by U-boats against attacking surface-ships that ran a zig-zag pattern hunting the U-boat (the goal was to locate the torpedo's circle-run just ahead of the attacking ship, hoping for a "lucky" hit).

Fat III / Lut I ("zig-zag" pattern): Initial torpedo course could be chosen, so the torpedo platform did not need to change its bearing to an optimal course for torpedo launch. The "Lut-speed" (i.e. the resulting advance-speed of the torpedo, considering the zig-zag pattern) could be chosen, and subsequently, the straight legs between turns would be adjusted accordingly.

Lut II: Same as Lut I, but even slower Lut-speeds could be chosen.

== List of World War II Luftwaffe torpedoes ==
| Type | | Codename | Propulsion | Dia./length | Range (speed) | Warhead (pistol) | Notes |
| Lw# | Type | Codename | Propulsion | Dia./length | Range (speed) | Warhead (pistol) | Notes |
|---|---|---|---|---|---|---|---|
| | F5 | | Wet heater | 450mm / 5550mm | 30hm (33kn) | unknown | Copy of the Norwegian F1 "Horten" torpedo. Limited drop-parametres (75kn airspeed/15-20m height) |
| LT I | F5a | | Wet heater | 450mm / 5550mm | 26hm (33kn) | unknown | German development of the Norwegian F1 "Horten" torpedo. Improved drop-parametres (140kn airspeed/50m height) |
| LT I A | F5b | | Wet heater | 449,6mm / 5490mm | 30hm (40kn) | unknown | Improved version of the F5a (increased capacity air tank and higher performance engine). |
| LT I A1 | F5b | | Wet heater | 449,6mm / 5490mm | 20hm (40kn) | GK1, GK2, GK2a, GK3, GK3a, GK4, GK4a, GK6 (PiF5s, Pi30, Pi30m, P42s, Pi43, Pi45, Pi50, Pi51, Pi52, Pi60) | Developed by Kriegsmarine for Luftwaffe. Fielded in 1941. The main German aerial torpedo of World War II, alongside the F5w. |
| LT I A2 | F5b | | Wet heater | 449,6mm / 5490mm | 30hm (33kn) | GK1, GK2, GK2a, GK3, GK3a, GK4, GK4a, GK6 (PiF5s, Pi30, Pi30m, P42s, Pi43, Pi45, Pi50, Pi51, Pi52, Pi60) | Never fielded. |
| LT I A3 | F5b | | Wet heater | 449,6mm / 5490mm | 60hm (24kn) | GK1, GK2, GK3, GK4, GK4a, GK6 (PiF5s, Pi30, P42s, Pi43, Pi45, Pi50, Pi51, Pi52, Pi60) | GA IX gyroscope with 9a program steering. |
| LT I B1 | F5b | | Wet heater | 449,6mm / 5490mm | 20hm (40kn) | GK1, GK2, GK2a, GK3, GK3a, GK4, GK4a, GK6 (PiF5s, Pi30, Pi30m, P42s, Pi43, Pi45, Pi50, Pi51, Pi52, Pi60) | LT I A1 with electric depth- and gyroscope settings. Fielded early 1944. |
| LT I B2 | F5b | | Wet heater | 449,6mm / 5490mm | 30hm (33kn) | GK1, GK2, GK2a, GK3, GK3a, GK4, GK4a, GK6 (PiF5s, Pi30, Pi30m, P42s, Pi43, Pi45, Pi50, Pi51, Pi52, Pi60) | LT I A2 with electric depth and gyroscope settings. Was probably only used for training purposes. |
| LT I B3 | F5b | | Wet heater | 449,6mm / 5490mm | 60hm (24kn) | GK1, GK2, GK3, GK4, GK4a, GK6 (PiF5s, Pi30, P42s, Pi43, Pi45, Pi50, Pi51, Pi52, Pi60) | LT I A3 with electric depth and gyroscope settings. Fielded in mid-1944. |
| LT I B4 | F5b | Pfau | Wet heater | 449,6mm / 5490mm | 60hm (24kn) | GK5, GK9 (Pi43, Pi45, Pi52, Pi52a, Pi65) | Passive Acoustic seeker (was ready for use, but never fielded before the end of the war). |
| LT I C | F5b | | Wet heater | 449,6mm / 5490mm | unknown | unknown | Never finished testing (development-program ended due to limited resources). |
| LT II | F5u | | Wet heater | 450mm / 5010mm | 14,8hm (45kn) | unknown | F5b with improved engine. 50 produced, never fielded. |
| LT II B1 | F5u | | Ingolin-engine | 449,6mm / 5490mm | 50hm (40kn) | unknown | Never finished testing (development-program ended due to limited resources). |
| LT II B3 | F5u | | Ingolin-engine | 449,6mm / 5490mm | 119hm (24kn) | unknown | GA 9b with 9b program steering. Never finished testing (development program ended due to limited resources). |
| LT II C | F5u | | Ingolin-engine | 449,6mm / 5490mm | unknown | unknown | GA 9b with 9b program steering. Never finished testing (development program ended due to limited resources). |
| | F5b | Geier I and II | Wet heater | 449,6mm / 5490mm | unknown | unknown | Active sonar homing, experimental. Similar to the Kriegsmarine TV. Development program with Kriegsmarine, but Luftwaffe ended up going for the "Pfau" instead. |
| | | Geier III | unknown | unknown | unknown | | Proposed development of the Geier II with system for enhancing and comparing the hydrophone echoes. Only reached planning phase. |
| | F5i | | Wet heater | 450mm / 5250mm | 30hm (40kn) | unknown | Italian standard aerial torpedo (unknown how much usage by Luftwaffe). |
| | F5w | | Wet heater | 450mm / 5460mm | 30hm (40kn) | unknown | Italian Whitehead torpedo. Standard torpedo in use by Luftwaffe alongside the LT I A1. |
| LT 280 | | | Electric | 500mm / 2600mm | 120hm (4-14kn) | unknown | Italian light torpedo. |
| LT 350 | | | Electric | ellipse-shaped hull 500mm / 2600mm | 150hm (4-14kn) | unknown | Italian parachute-torpedo. Dropped from a height of 100m. It ran autonomously irregular search-patterns within a 1000x800m box for about one hour with speed decreasing from 14 to 4kn. |
| LT 850 | | | Wet heater | 450mm / 5470mm | 20hm (42kn) | unknown | German designation for the successful Japanese airdropped Type 91 Mod 2 torpedo, using Japanese-devised pneumatic PID controller for roll stabilization. 70 torpedoes were delivered (it is not known which IJN sub delivered them), but none were used operationally. Intended weight of 810 kg (1,786 lb) complete for deployment. |
| LT 1000a | | | Ingolin turbine-engine | ellipse-shaped hull (390x200mm) / 5000mm | unknown (40kn) | unknown | Never finished testing (development-program ended due to limited resources). |
| LT 1000b | | | Ingolin turbine-engine | ellipse-shaped hull (460x800mm) / 5398mm | unknown (40kn) | unknown | A variant with altered tailsection/rudders. |
| LT 950 | F5b | | Wet heater | 450mm / 5360mm | 30hm (40kn) | unknown | "Flügeltorpedo": F5b equipped with glider-attachment (wings and rudders). Experimental (several variants), not fielded. A maximum range of 2300m glidepath when dropped from a height of 800m were obtained during testing. |
| LT 9,2 | F5b | Frosch | Wet heater | 450mm / 5100mm | unknown | unknown | A variant of the "Flügeltorpedo" that was not pursued in favour of the LT950C. |
| LT 950C (L10 Flügelantrieb) | F5b | Friedensengel | Wet heater | 450mm / 5100mm | 90hm | unknown | The final variant of the "Flügeltorpedo". |
| LT 1200A | | | Ingolin rocket-engine (HWK) | 450mm / 5200mm | 22hm (40kn) | unknown | Development ended due to the torpedo being too heavy and having too short a range (weight: 815 kg). |
| LT 1200B | | | Ingolin rocket-engine (HWK) | 533,4mm / 7000mm | 50hm (35kn) | unknown | Development ended due to the torpedo being too heavy and having too short a range (weight: 1200 kg). |
| LT 1500 Turbinen-antrieb | | | Ingolin turbine-engine (HWK/CPVA) | 533,4mm / 7050mm | 35hm (40kn) | unknown | Improved version of the LT 1200, but similar the development ended due to the torpedo being too heavy and having too short a range (weight: 1520 kg). |
| LT 1500 Raketen-antrieb | | | Ingolin rocket-engine (HWK/CPVA) | 533,4mm / 7050mm | unknown | unknown | LT 1500 variant with rocket-engine. |

=== Luftwaffe torpedo designation system ===
As a general rule, Luftwaffe followed the Kriegsmarine system of code names and designations, but with some differences.

Variations for the letter(s) indicating specific features regarding propulsion and control:

- b = Pressluft/Dampfgemisch-Antrieb (pressurized air/steam engine)
- i and w = Italian-built torpedoes by the firms Silurificio Italiano S/A (Naples) and Whitehead (Fiume) respectively.

Instead of letters and numbers denoting dimensions and features, a single 3 or 4 digit number was used for some torpedo designs.

Luftwaffe used the "LT" designation (= Lufttorpedo), but not limited to operational torpedoes. It also combined further letters and numbers to indicate type and features of the torpedo:

- I = Pressluft/Dampfgemisch-Antrieb (pressurized air/steam engine)
- II = Ingolin-Antrieb (use of hydrogen-peroxide as oxygen carrier)
- A = Tiefen- und Winkeleinstellung von Hand (manual setting of depth and steering)
- B = Elektrische Tiefen- und Winkeleinstellung (electric setting of depth and steering, i.e. possible to change in flight)
- C = Programmsteuerung (program steering)
- 1 = Speed of 40kn
- 2 = Speed of 33kn
- 3 = Speed of 24kn

==== Warheads ====
Luftwaffe warheads were designated GK (= Gefechtskopf) followed by a number and a small Arabic letter for variants. Exerciseheads was designated ÜK (= Übungskopf). The various types of explosives are described under the section of Kriegsmarine warheads above.

Operational warheads (weight/type of explosive charge):

- GK 1: 200 kg/S3
- GK 2: 180 kg/S3
- GK 2a: 240 kg/S3
- GK 3: 188 kg/S17
- GK 3a: 250 kg/S17

Warheads in various state of development/test and production by end of the war (weight/type of explosive charge):

- GK 4: 230 kg/S18
- GK 4a: 220 kg/S18
- GK 5: 175 kg/S18
- GK 6: 180 kg/S3
- GK 9: 165 kg/S18
- GK 50: 300 kg/S18

==== Pistols ====
Designations for Luftwaffe pistols used the same system as Kriegsmarine.

The following torpedopistols reached operational status with Luftwaffe during WW2:

- Pi F5: Nose-mounted Luftwaffe adaption of the Kriegsmarine mechanical Pi G7A-AZ pistol (similar design with a reduced physical size)
- Pi 30: Pi F5 with connector for activation by an additional top-mounted magnetich mechanism
- Pi 42s: Nose-mounted mechanic mechanism in a Pi F5 housing without detonation-arms/whiskers. Used in combination with the Pi 50-series top-mounted magnetic pistols
- Pi 42s (e1): Pi 42s with electrical detonators, and an electric armingswitch controlled by the magnetic top-mounted Pi 52 magnetic pistol
- Pi 45: Pi 42s with an inertia (pendolum) mechanism and electric detonators. Used with (and activated by) the Pi 52 or Pi 65 top-mounted magnetic mechanisms.
- Pi 50: Italian top-mounted SIC combined mechanical/magnetic pistol. Used for LT IA and LT IB torpedoes. Similar design as the Kriegsmarine TZ 3.
- Pi 51: German produced magnetic version of the Italian SIC-pistol. Acted as a magnetic sensor and when activated, triggered the electric detonators in the nose-mounted mechanichal mechanism (Pi 30 or Pi 42s)
- Pi 52 (Pi Wien): Improved Pi 51 (ready, but never used before the war ended)
- Pi 52a: Improved Pi 52 for use in warheads with nose-mounted acoustic-seeker (ready, but never used before the war ended)
- Pi 52b: Adaption of the Pi 52 for use with Bombentorpedo (BT) (ready, but never used as the Bombentorpedoes never became operational)
- Pi 60: Active top-mounted magnetic mechanism, developed from the Kriegsmarine TZ 6. Used with the nose-mounted Pi 30
- Pi 65: Luftwaffe-adaption of the Kriegsmarine top-mounted TZ 5, for use with the "Pfau" and "Geier" torpedoes (active magnetic-mechanism) in combination with the nose-mounted Pi 45. Ready, but never used as the torpedoes were never fielded

=== Bombentorpedoes ===
Luftwaffe also developed a passive weapon called "Bombentorpedo" (BT), which was planned to replace the conventional torpedoes. It was airdropped from a low height and relative short distance from the target, would enter the water and travel the short remaining distance solely driven by its kinetic energy. No BT's were ever fielded operationally.

| Type | Weight | Dia. / length | Charge | Notes |
|---|---|---|---|---|
| BT200 | 220 kg | 300mm / 2395mm | 100 kg | |
| BT400 | 435 kg | 378mm / 2946mm | 200 kg | |
| BT700A | 780 kg | 426mm / 3500mm | 330 kg | |
| BT700B | 755 kg | 456mm / 3358mm | 320 kg | |
| BT1000 | 1180 kg | 480mm / 4240mm | 710 kg | Variant fitted with a rocket-engine, but the design was not successful. |
| BT1400 | 1510 kg | 620mm / 4560mm | 920 kg | |
| BT1850 | 1923 kg | 620mm / 4690mm | 1050 kg | |

== German torpedo platforms (Torpedoträger) ==
=== Kriegsmarine ===
- Submarines (U-Boote)
- Motor torpedo boats (S-Boote - Schnellboote or E-Boats as designated by the Royal Navy)
- Larger surface vessels like battleships (Schlachtschiffe), cruisers (Kreuzer / Panzerschiffe), destroyers (Zerstörer), escorts/ corvettes/ frigates (Torpedoboote)
- Various types of "irregular" surface vessels, like auxiliary cruisers/raiders (Hilfskreuzer) and Q-ships.
- Fortified shore-based batteries (Torpedosperrbatterie)
- Various temporary torpedo batteries were established at strategic locations for a period of time - (for instance as a substitute until a more permanent battery was established, or as a temporary defence for an improvised naval base etc.). These batteries varied from single to multiple tube launchers placed on quay/pier/suitable spot-on-the-ground or on small anchored boats/barges (schwimmende Batterie). An S-Boot anchored in fixed locations with its bow (and thus its torpedo tubes) facing one direction could also serve in this role. Typical armament for shore-based and temporary batteries were tubes from dismantled surface vessels (533mm Zwilling-, Drilling- or Vierling-Rohrsätze), Beutewaffe - i.e. tubes/torpedoes captured from the enemy, or older equipment from World War I.

=== Luftwaffe ===
Various aircraft designed for/configured as torpedo carriers:

- Heinkel He 59: Obsolete, only in service from 1937 to ca 1940 (capacity: 1 torpedo)
- Arado Ar 95 A: Limited number intended as a carrier-based torpedobomber, but was obsolete by 1940 (capacity: 1 torpedo)
- Arado Ar 195: Intended as a carrier-based torpedobomber, only a few prototypes used for testing in competition with the Fi 176, never used operationally (capacity: 1 torpedo)
- Fieseler Fi 167 A: Intended as a carrier-based torpedobomber, only a pre-production series built and tested towards the Ar 195 (capacity: 1 torpedo)
- Dornier Do 22: A few produced for export, never used by Luftwaffe (capacity: 1 torpedo)
- Blohm & Voss Ha 140: Only a few prototypes used for testing in competition with the He 115 (capacity: 1 torpedo)
- Heinkel He 115: Luftwaffe's first modern torpedobomber. In service from 1940 to 1942 (capacity: 1 torpedo)
- Junkers Ju 87 C: Experimental torpedobomber intended for carrier-operations. Never used operationally (capacity: 1 torpedo)
- Heinkel 111 J: Only a few built for torpedo trials in 1938, but ended up being used for reconnaissance (capacity: 2 torpedoes)
- Heinkel 111 H: The main standard German torpedobomber, in service from 1941 and throughout WW2 (capacity: 2 torpedoes)
- Junkers Ju 88 A: Standard German torpedobomber together with the He 111 H, in service from 1942 and throughout WW2 (capacity: 2 torpedoes)
- Junkers 188 E: Standard German torpedobomber introduced to service in 1944 (capacity: 2 torpedoes)
- Focke-Wulf Fw 200 C: Experimental torpedobomber, only used for one operation in 1941 (capacity: 2 or 4 torpedoes)
- Focke-Wulf Fw 190 A: Experimental torpedobomber tested in 1943. Never used operationally (capacity: 1 torpedo)
- Focke-Wulf Fw 190 F: Experimental torpedobomber tested in 1943. Never used operationally (capacity: 1 torpedo)
- Heinkel 177 A-5: Experimental torpedobomber. Never used operationally (capacity: 2 or 4 torpedoes)
- Heinkel 177 R-6: Experimental torpedobomber. Never used operationally (capacity: 2 or 4 torpedoes)
- Messerschmitt Me 410 B: Experimental torpedobomber tested in 1944. Never used operationally (capacity: 1 torpedo)
- Dornier Do 217 E: Planned/experimental torpedobomber intended for use with new torpedo designs in development with advanced controls. Never used operationally (capacity: 2 or 4 torpedoes)
- Dornier Do 217 K: Planned/experimental torpedobomber intended for use with new torpedo designs in development with advanced controls. Never used operationally (capacity: 2 or 4 torpedoes)
- Dornier Do 217 M: Planned/experimental torpedobomber intended for use with new torpedo designs in development with advanced controls. Never used operationally (capacity: 2 or 4 torpedoes)
- Fokker T.VIII W: Dutch torpedobomber. Beutewaffe never used operationally as torpedobomber by Luftwaffe (capacity: 1 torpedo)
