= Hai (midget submarine) =

German midget submarine prototype

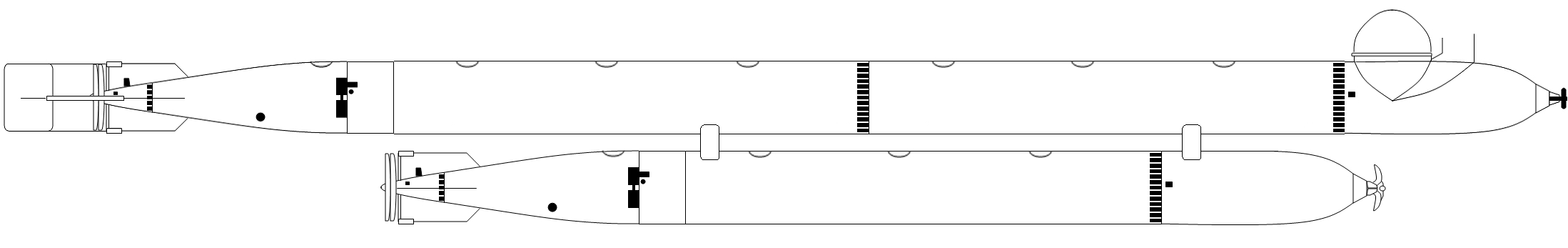

History

Nazi Germany
- Name: Hai

General characteristics
- Class & type: Marder-class midget submarine
- Length: 11 m (36 ft 1 in)
- Beam: 0.533 m (21 in)
- Propulsion: Electric
- Complement: 1
- Notes: The Hai could remain under water for up to two hours.

Hai (shark) was an advanced model of the Marder-class midget submarines created in Nazi Germany during World War II and operated by the K-Verband. Its prototype performed poorly during test runs and therefore no other boats were produced.

The Hai was 11 meters (36 ft 1 in) long and its length allowed for larger batteries, giving it the maximum speed of 20 knots (37 km/h; 23 mph) under water. In addition, the Hai could remain under water for up to two hours.

== Bibliography ==
- Paterson, Lawrence (2006). Weapons of desperation : German frogmen and midget submarines of the Second World War. London: Chatham. ISBN 1861762798.
- Prenatt, Jamie & Stille, Mark (2014). Axis Midget Submarines: 1939–45. Oxford, UK: Osprey Publishing. ISBN 978-1-4728-0122-7.
