= Black May =

Black May may refer to:

- Black May (Thailand), 1992 protests and military crackdown in Thailand
- Black May (World War II), a period (May 1943) in the Atlantic campaign during World War II
