= T11 torpedo =

The G7es (TXI) "Zaunkönig II" was a torpedo developed for German U-boats during World War II. The torpedo was electric and had an effective range of 5,700 metres (6,200 yd) at a speed of 24 knots (44 km/h; 28 mph). This torpedo employed acoustic, passive homing to find its target after a straight run of 400 metres (440 yd). This evolution of the G7es torpedo was created to counter the Allies' Foxer noise-maker countermeasure. This weapon was never actually employed in wartime as Germany had surrendered by the time testing was fully completed.

The only known deployment of G7es (TXI) was on the final mission for U-534 which was depth-charged and sunk by RAF aircraft on 5 May 1945. Of the 16 torpedoes salvaged from the wreck in 1993 at least three were TXI's. One torpedo was restored and is currently on display alongside the U-boat in the United Kingdom, while the rest were picked for parts and blown up.

== See also ==
- G7e torpedo
- List of World War II torpedoes of Germany
