= G7e torpedo =

German submarine-launched torpedo of World War 2

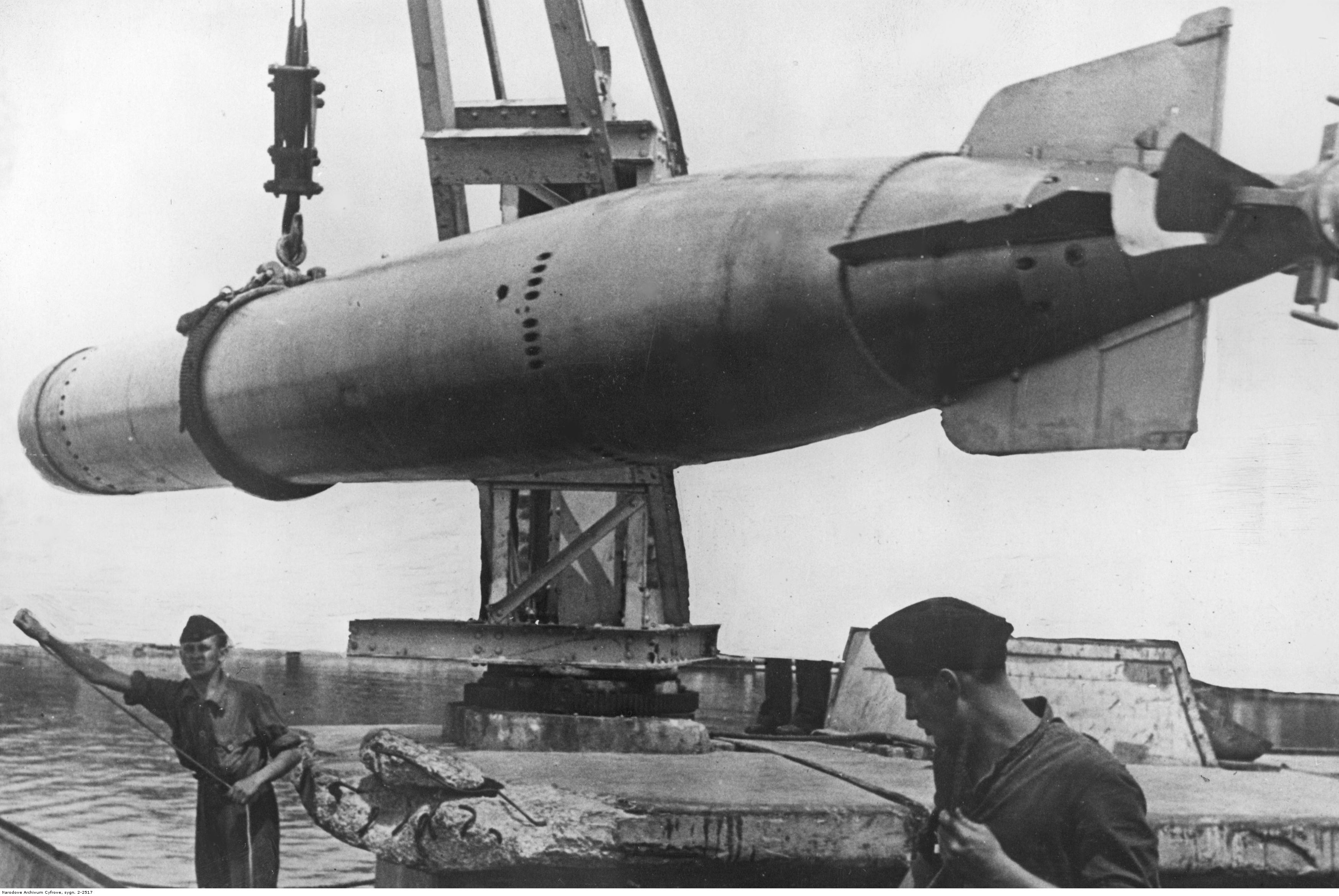
- A G7e torpedo being hoisted with a crane by a work crew, April 1943.
- Type: Heavyweight anti surface torpedo
- Place of origin: Nazi Germany

Service history
- Used by: Kriegsmarine
- Wars: World War II

Production history
- Variants: G7e(TII); G7e(TIII); G7e(TIIIa); G7e(TIV) Falke; G7e(TV) Zaunkönig I G7e(TXI) Zaunkönig II; TX Spinne + additional 13 models

Specifications
- Mass: TII, TIII: 1,605 kg (3,538 lb); TIIIa: 1,755 kg (3,869 lb); TIV Falke: 1,397 kg (3,080 lb); TV Zaunkönig I, TXI Zaunkönig II: 1,497 kg (3,300 lb); TX Spinne: 1,619 kg (3,569 lb)
- Length: 7.163 m (23.50 ft)
- Diameter: 534.5 mm (21.04 in)
- Warhead weight: 300 kg (660 lb)
- Engine: Electric; Lead-acid batteries
- Operational range: TII, TIII: 5,000 m (2.7 nmi); TIIIa: 7,500 m (4.0 nmi); TIV Falke: >7,500 m (4.0 nmi); TV Zaunkönig I, TXI Zaunkönig II: 5,700 m (3.1 nmi); TX Spinne: 3,000 m (1.6 nmi)
- Maximum speed: TII, TIII, TIIIa, TX Spinne: 30 kn (56 km/h); TIV Falke: 20 kn (37 km/h); TV Zaunkönig I: 25 kn (46 km/h); TXI Zaunkönig II: 24 kn (44 km/h)
- Launch platform: Submarines

The G7e torpedo was the standard electric torpedo used by the German Kriegsmarine submarines in World War II. It came in 20 different versions, with the initial model G7e(TII) in service at the outbreak of the war. Due to several problems, leading to the German "Torpedokrise" which lasted until the end of 1941, the improved G7e(TIII) took over as the standard electric torpedo used by German U-boats for the rest of the war. G7e torpedoes measured 533.4 mm (21.00 in) in diameter and about 7.2 m (24 ft) in length. Depending on the type, the warhead contained a main charge of 250–280 kg (550–620 lb) of Schießwolle 36, a mixture of dipicrylamine and TNT. All were powered by 60–72 kW (80–100 hp) electric motors and lead-acid batteries which required onboard maintenance to maintain their functionality.

Other major G7e-versions that saw operational service during the war, were the first acoustic homing torpedo G7es(TIV) Falke and its improved successor G7es(TV) Zaunkönig.

== G7e(TII) ==
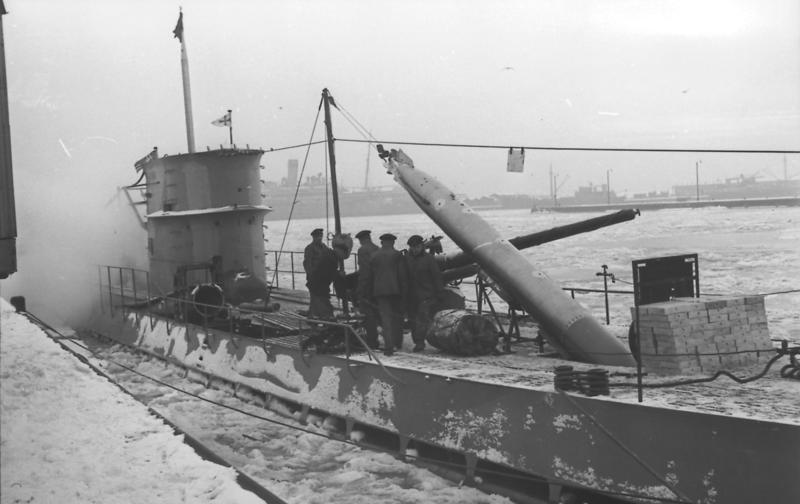
Loading a G7e(TII) onto a Type IX U-boat in Wilhelmshaven, in 1939.

The G7e(TII) went in service with German U-boat fleets in 1936. Its existence was virtually unknown to the British until fragments of one torpedo were recovered following the sinking of HMS Royal Oak in October 1939. The advantages of the G7e in contrast to the G7a wet-heater steam-driven torpedo rested in its simplicity and cheapness of manufacture (half the cost), as well as being virtually silent and leaving almost no visible trail of air bubbles to alert ships that they were under attack. However, in all other respects, the TII was less reliable and performed unpredictably compared to the G7a(TI), with shorter range of 5,000 m (5,500 yd) and slower speed at 56 km/h (30 kn). Additionally, the batteries of these torpedoes needed to be preheated to a temperature of 30 °C (86 °F) to operate with maximum speed and range, though generally this was not a problem since U-boats had the element of surprise and often had the advantage of firing the first shot.

Poor range and speed were not the TII's only problems. Both the contact and magnetic detonators were unreliable, major flaws that also afflicted the United States Navy's standard Mark 14 anti-submarine and anti-ship torpedo. The magnetic influence exploder, designed to allow the torpedo to run under the keel of a ship and detonate, breaking the ship's back, was inconsistent and would often detonate prematurely, or not at all. This led the BdU to order that all G7e(TII) torpedoes be fired only for contact detonation. However, the contact pistol of the TII also proved to be unreliable; the British battleship HMS Nelson managed to survive almost certain destruction when three torpedoes from U-56 struck on her keel, two broke upon hitting and the other failed to explode.

During the first eight months of the war, torpedoes often ran at an improper depth, detonated prematurely, or failed to explode – sometimes bouncing harmlessly off the hull of the target ship. This was most evident in Operation Weserübung, the invasion of Denmark and Norway, where various skilled U-boat commanders failed to inflict damage on British transports and warships because of faulty torpedoes. The faults were largely due to lack of testing. The magnetic detonator was sensitive to mechanical oscillations during the torpedo run and fluctuations in the Earth's magnetic field at high latitudes. These early magnetic detonators were eventually phased out. The depth-keeping problem remained. In January 1942 the cause was discovered by accident: when ventilating torpedoes during maintenance, excess internal air-pressure in the U-boat could offset the depth-setting mechanism in the torpedo's balance chamber.

Nevertheless, the German Navy, after much prodding by German U-boat Command (BdU), invested resources into correcting the TII's flaws. Gradually, it improved, and by the end of the Norwegian Campaign problems with the contact exploder and depth-keeping gear had been mostly solved, with significant strides made in improving the magnetic proximity feature. At the same time, the TII's range was increased from 5,000 to 7,500 m (5,500 to 8,200 yd). By that time, however, the TII was already being phased out of production.

== G7e(TIII) ==
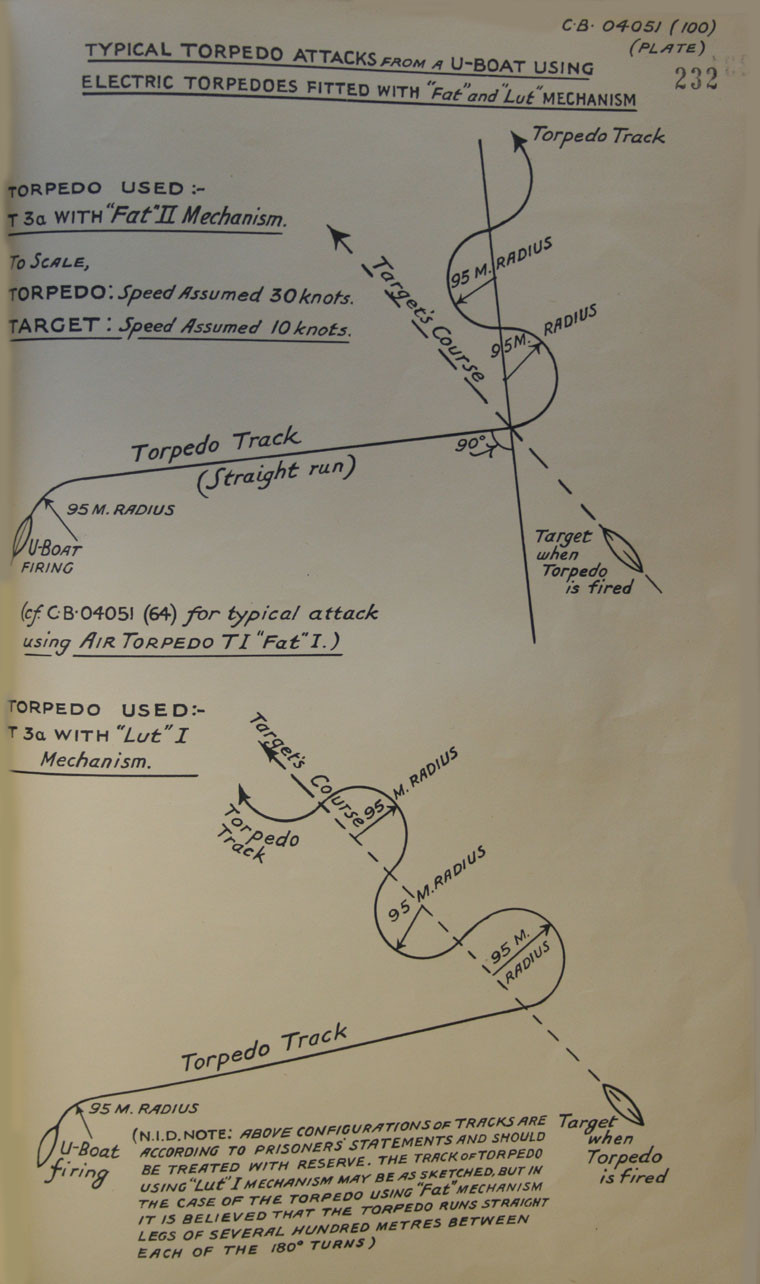
The behavior of German pattern-running torpedoes.

Improvements in the design of the G7e(TII) were incorporated into the production of the next model of electric torpedo for Germany's U-boat fleet. Introduced in mid 1942, the TIIIa improved upon the range of the TII with new batteries. The faulty exploders from the TII were scrapped in favor of a new design with the introduction of TIII in December 1942, which implemented a much more reliable magnetic pistol. Range for the TIII was the same as the TII, at 5,000 m (2.7 nmi). Though many opportunities had been missed due to the defects of the TII torpedo, with the new TIII U-boats were deadlier than ever.

The TIIIa had a range of 7,500 m (4.0 nmi) and could achieve 30 kn (56 km/h). With the improved design the TIII complemented the G7a(TI) wet-heater torpedo, which was only used at night for the rest of the war (it remained the only torpedo used by surface ships though), and the TIII was used for day-attacks. Using the TIII's perfected proximity feature, U-boat captains could effectively fire under the keel of a ship and break the back of their targets with a single torpedo, increasing the overall effectiveness of the U-boat fleet. The TIII was also issued with program steering FaT - G7e(TIII FaT II) - and LuT - G7e(TIII LuT II) - pattern running systems for attacking well-defended convoys. The FaT (Flächen-Absuch-Torpedo or Federapparat-Torpedo) and LuT(LageUnabhängiger Torpedo) ran straight out to a preset distance before traveling in either a circular or ladder-like pattern through the convoy lanes. This increased the probability of a hit. The torpedo had one setting to regulate the length of the prerun, after which one of four possible settings kicked in and made the torpedo zigzag either left or right on short (1200 m; 2/3 nmi) or long (1900 m; 1 nautical mile) legs. When fired, the U-boat sent out a warning to the other U-boats in the vicinity, encouraging them to dive in order to avoid being struck. The FAT torpedo became available in late-1942 and often used during the convoy battles of March 1943.

A further modified pattern-running variant was the TIIId "Dackel", with an enormous endurance of 57 km (31 nmi) at a cost of greatly reduced speed of 9 kn (17 km/h) and increased weight of 2,216 kg (4,885 lb). Like the FaT and LuT, this was designed to run a ladder search pattern.

Additional variants of the TIII were the TIIIb with a weight of 1,347 kg (2,970 lb) - used as the propulsion module of human torpedoes like the Neger and Marder - and TIIIc, used as the weapon payload for the same, with a weight of 1,338 kg (2,950 lb). Both of these had a maximal speed of 18.5 kn (34.3 km/h) and range of 4,000 m (2.2 nmi) at their top speed. Typical speeds for such vehicles were approximately 4 kn (7.4 km/h), greatly increasing range, whereas the payload moved at its top speed. A related development was the TIIIe "Kreuzotter", used as the payload by the midget submarines Molch and Seehund, with a weight of 1,343 kg (2,961 lb), a speed of 20 kn (37 km/h), and a range of over 7,500 m (4.0 nmi).

== G7es(TIV) Falke ==
The TIV Model was the adjunct of the earlier TIII model in nearly every way. The TIV was not an ordinary straight-running torpedo, it ran at 37 km/h (20 kn) for 7,500 m (8,200 yd) and was the world's first operational acoustic homing torpedo, since it was introduced in March 1943, the same month and year as the American Mk-24 "Mine" acoustic homing torpedo.

Early in 1933 Germany started development and testing of acoustic homing mechanisms for torpedoes. From the outset of submarine warfare, submariners had dreamed of being able to aim and fire torpedoes without surfacing or using a periscope. The periscope gives away the location of a submarine, and a hull-penetrating periscope greatly weakens a submarine's pressure hull and limits the depths to which it can dive. U-boats also had to come to very shallow depths to use their periscopes, generally about 15 m (50 ft), leaving them greatly exposed to bombing, depth charging, and even gunfire.

With the introduction of Falke, U-boats could remain more deeply submerged and fire at convoys with nothing to give away their position but the noise of their screws. Rather than aiming with a periscope, the torpedo could be roughly aimed at a sound contact as detected by a U-boat's hydrophones, and the homing mechanism could be trusted to find the target without the need for precise aiming.

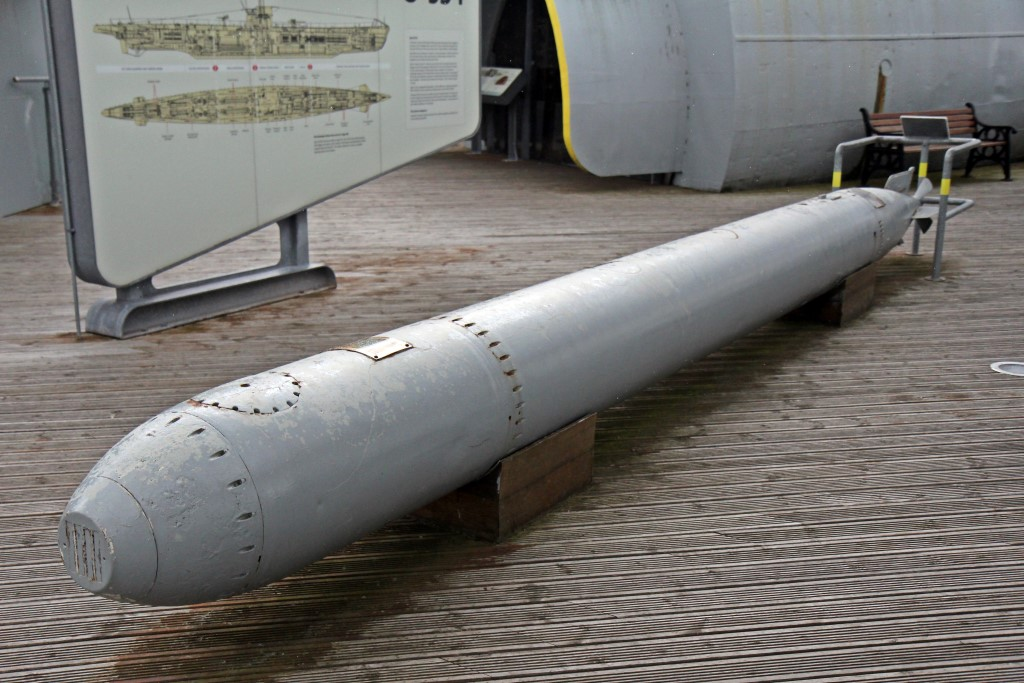
A G7es "Zaunkönig" exhibited alongside U-534 at Woodside Ferry, Birkenhead.

Falke worked much like a normal straight-running torpedo for the first 400 m (440 yd) of its run, after which its acoustic sensors became active and searched for a target. The sensitive sound-sensing equipment in Falke required the torpedo be as quiet as possible, hence it ran at only 37 km/h (20 kn); in addition, the firing U-boat was forced to stop its motors. Falke was intended to home on merchant targets, however, so its slow speed was not a great hindrance.

In February 1943, the T4 "Falke", was tested on a small scale with moderate success, but could only be used against large, slow ships. The Falke ran straight to an arming distance of 1000 m before turning towards the loudest noise detected. Its successor, the G7es(TV) "Zaunkönig" (referred to by the Allies as GNAT, for German Navy Acoustic Torpedo), was designed to combat small and fast warships, entering service September 1943.

Though its period of operational service was brief, Falke was a proof of concept for the acoustic homing torpedo. Its introduction occurred only two months before the U.S. Navy achieved its initial combat success with the Mark 24 FIDO "mine." FIDO was not a mine, but a passive, acoustic-homing torpedo designed for use by long-range patrol aircraft. The initial success with the Mark 24 occurred on 14 May 1943, when a PBY-5 from VP-84 sank U-640 with the new weapon. Most sources indicate that the Germans' first combat success with the Zaunkönig (GNAT) did not occur until September 1943. While the Allies became aware in September 1943 that the Germans had brought GNAT into operational service, it was not until the capture of U-505 in June 1944 that they obtained reliable data on the German homing torpedo.

== See also ==
- List of World War II torpedoes of Germany
- Mark XI torpedo - reverse-engineered British copy
- Mark 18 torpedo - reverse-engineered American copy
- Type 92 Mod 2 torpedo - hybrid collaborative project between Japan and Germany
