= Molch =

Series of one-man midget submarines

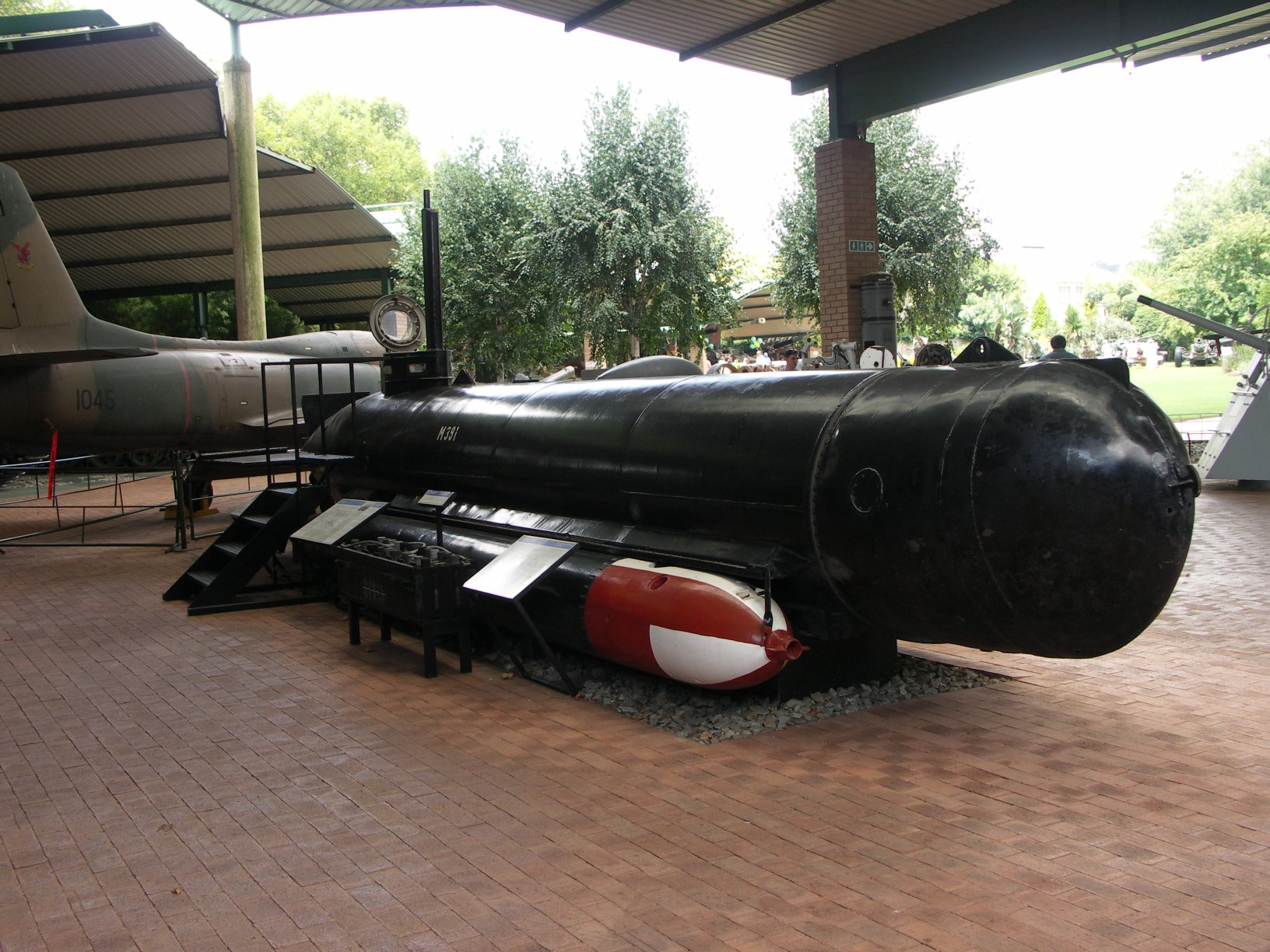
- Molch M391

Class overview
- Name: Molch
- Builders: AG Weser, Bremen.
- Operators: Kriegsmarine
- Succeeded by: Biber
- Built: 1944
- Completed: 393

General characteristics
- Class & type: Midget submarine
- Propulsion: Electric motor
- Range: 64 km (40 mi) at 5 knots (9.3 km/h; 5.8 mph)
- Crew: 1
- Armament: Two × G7e torpedoes

Molch (German language: "newt" or "salamander") was an unsuccessful series of one-man midget submarines created during World War II. Built in 1944, it was the first mini-submarine of Nazi Germany's Kriegsmarine, but was not successful in combat operations and suffered heavy losses.

== Description ==
The Molch was based on torpedo technology, and carried two G7e torpedoes attached externally on either side of the craft. It was fully electrical and was created for coastal operations, with a range of 64 km (35 nmi) at 5 knots (9.3 km/h; 5.8 mph). The front section of the boat held a large battery. The operator sat between two small trimming tanks behind the battery. Behind the operator was the electric motor. The complicated system of tanks made it difficult to control during combat operations.

The first of 393 boats were delivered on June 12, 1944, and were built by AG Weser in Bremen.

== Operational history ==
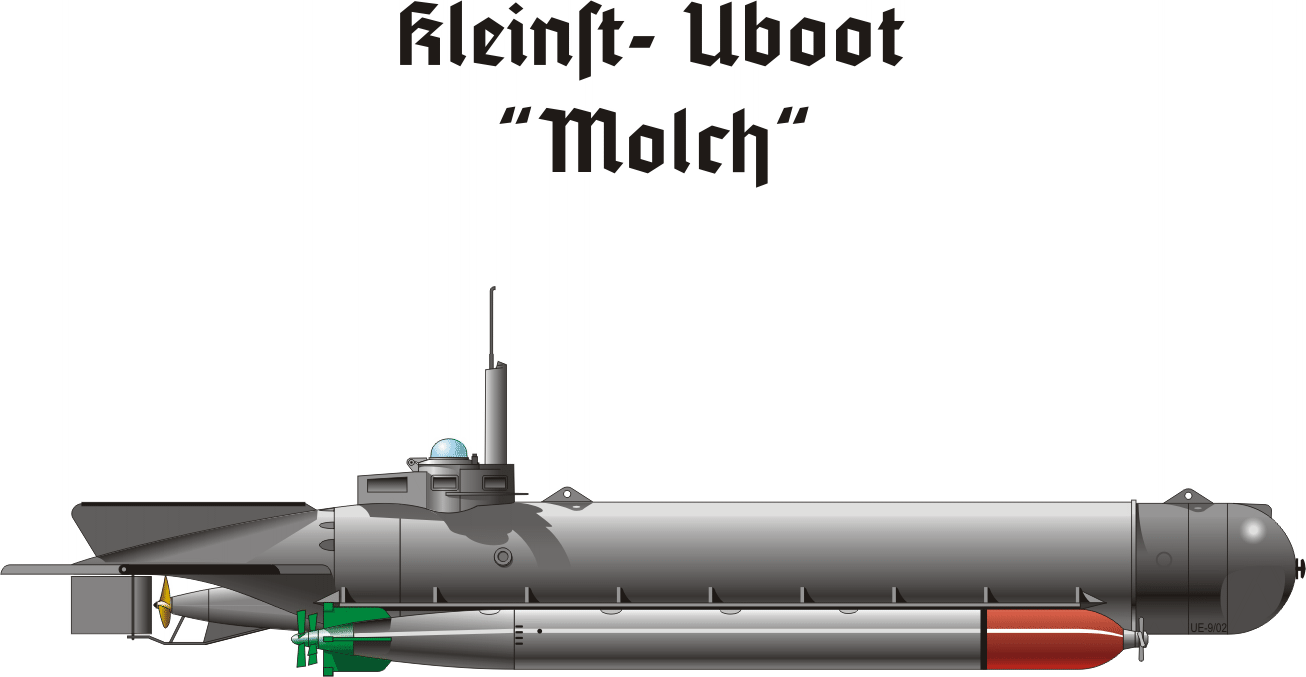
Side view of the Molch

The Molch were first used in the Mediterranean against the Allied "Operation Dragoon" in 1944. The submarines were a part of the K-Verband 411 flotilla. On the night of September 25 they attacked Allied battleships, with the loss of ten out of the twelve Molch submarines in the flotilla. Shortly after, the remaining two were sunk by Allied warship bombardment off the Sanremo coast.

Other Molch flotillas were sent to the Netherlands in December 1944, but were also unsuccessful. From January to April 1945, Molch and Biber submarines went out on 102 sorties, losing seventy of their own and sank only seven small ships. Due to the ineffectiveness of the Molch in combat operations, it was later used as a training vessel for more advanced midget submarines.

== Survivors ==
South Africa
Molch M391 at the South African National Museum of Military History
