= G7a torpedo =

World War II German torpedo

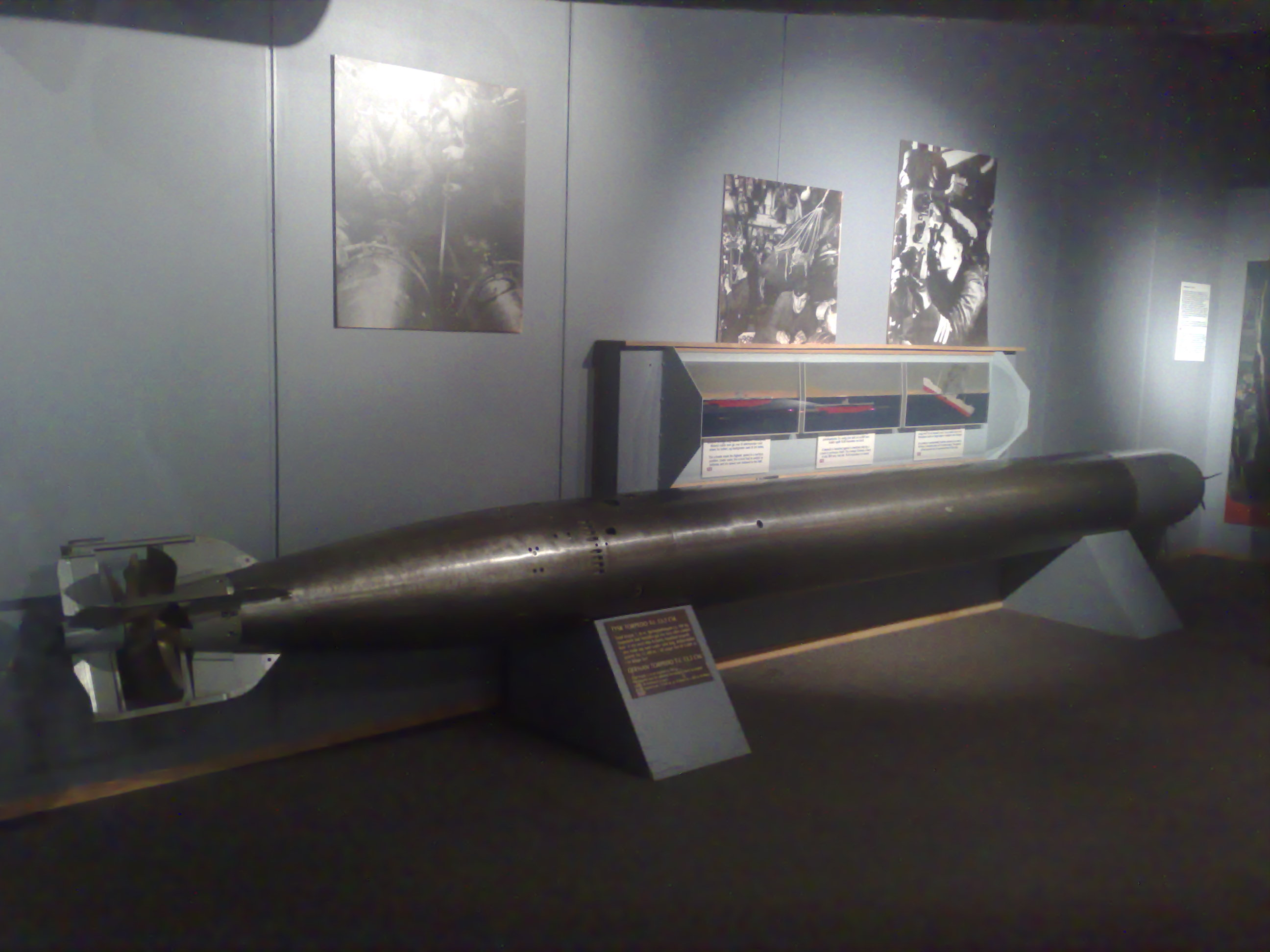
German G7a(TI) torpedo at the Norwegian Armed Forces Museum in Oslo

The G7a(TI) was the standard issue Kriegsmarine torpedo introduced to service in 1934. It was a steam-powered design, using a wet heater engine burning decaline, with a range of 7,500 metres (24,600 ft) at 40 knots (74 km/h; 46 mph) speed. In 1936, the Kriegsmarine's first electrical powered torpedo was introduced with the G7e(TII). It was replaced beginning in 1942 by the G7e(TIII). The G7a(TI) remained in service as the main torpedo of Kriegsmarine for the length of the war, being the only torpedo used from surface vessels, and alongside electric torpedoes on the uboats.

== Design ==
The G7a(TI) torpedo was 533.4 mm (21.00 in) in diameter, 7,163 millimetres (23 feet 6.0 inches) in length (with a type Ka or Kb warhead and Pi1 or Pi2 pistol), the warhead holding a charge of approximately 280 kg (620 lb) of Schießwolle 36. It was Kriegsmarine's first operational torpedo (hence "TI" = Torpedo number one), and the standard issue torpedo for all German U-boats and surface torpedo-bearing vessels from 1934 to the end of WW2.

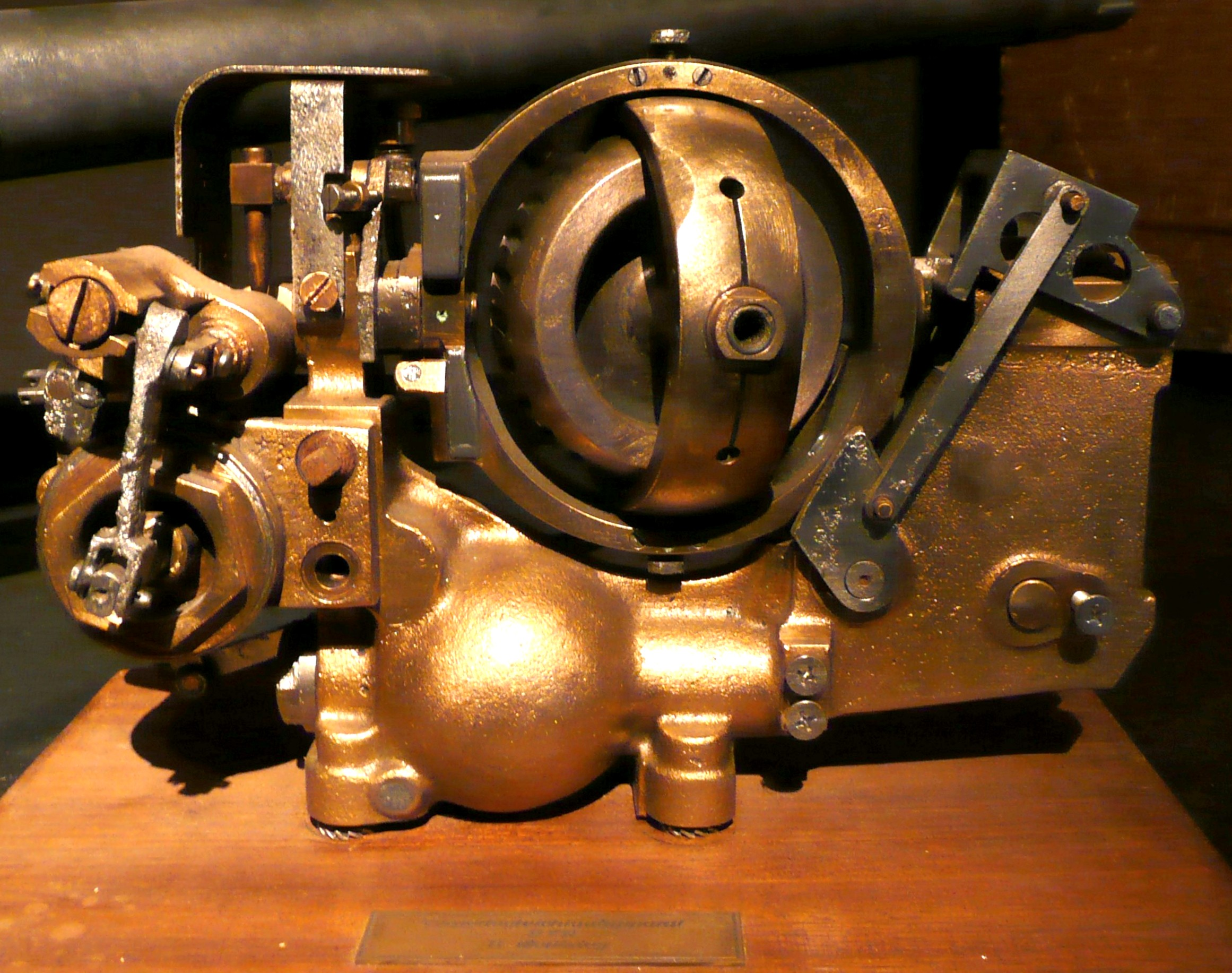
The GA VIII gyroscope, as used in the G7a(TI) torpedo

The torpedo was a straight-running unguided design, controlled by a gyroscope. The TI had variable speed, running a distance of 5,000 m at 81 km/h (5,500 yd at 44kt), 7,500 m at 74 km/h (8,250 yd at 40 kt), and 12,000 m at 55.6 km/h (13,200 yd at 30 kt). The 44 kt setting was used only by torpedo boats like the Schnellboote on torpedoes with a reinforced engine.

The TI was the last naval torpedo of German design in operational use with the traditional standard wet heat method of propulsion. The torpedo was powered by an engine fed by a mixture of compressed air and steam. Decaline fuel was burning in a combustion chamber, creating steam from fresh water. The torpedo's speed was determined by the level of pressure (three settings for 30/40/44 kn) from the low-pressure regulator feeding air to the bottom of the combustion chamber. The resulting superheated steam powered a four cylinder reciprocating engine, in turn powering a pair of contra-rotating propellers.

Though this system of propulsion gave the TI great speed and endurance it had the distinct disadvantage of being very noisy and leaving a long wake of bubbles, common to most non-electric torpedoes of the period, with the exception of the Japanese surface-launched Type 93 and submarine-launched Type 95, which were propelled by engines using pure oxygen as the oxidizer. For U-boats, this relegated the TI for use mainly at night, when its wake was least noticeable, so as to not give away the element of surprise and the location of the submarine that fired it. During daytime, the electrically-propelled G7e were favored.

For the period 1934-1940 the only available warhead for the TI and TII were of the Ka type, with two available pistols: The Pi G7A-AZ and the Pi G7a-MZ. The former was a direct-acting mechanical pistol, while the latter had an additional proximity mechanism (magnetic influence). Both mechanisms were flawed and contributed to the German "Torpedokrise" (Torpedo Crisis) which lasted from the start of the war and through 1942. The mechanical deflection arms was designed too short, and the magnetic igniting-mechanism couldn't be properly tuned for the natural magnetic fields in the northern hemisphere and narrow fjords. These issues led to premature or late detonations, as well as failing to detonate even when hitting the target, in numerous cases during this period until properly working pistols were introduced with first the mechanical Pi1, and later the combined mechanical/magnetic Pi2. Also, the depth mechanism had a design-issue leading to leakage of vacuum when stored on the U-boats, causing the torpedo to run deep. The problems were common for the TI and TII torpedoes, but the TI also had issues with weak engine blocks (cracking at 44 kt setting), and the TII had issues with poorly performing batteries.

The problems were so serious, Admiral Dönitz said, "...never before in military history has a force been sent into battle with such a useless weapon." In general, all issues were resolved by 1942 when new depth mechanisms and new pistols had been developed and put into service. The TII was then also replaced by the TIII with improved batteries.

== Use ==
There is at least one recorded case of a U-boat being bombed based upon her position being given away by a TI's wake. On 14 September 1939, U-30 was attacked by loitering United Kingdom Fairey Swordfish naval bombers when she fired a TI from her stern torpedo tube at the SS Fanad Head. U-30 was undamaged in the attack and served until she was scuttled at the end of the war.

The TI were also issued in versions with program-steering gyroscopes, using the Fat I and Lut I or Lut II pattern running mechanisms - primary for use in attacking convoys and as self-defence against allied escorts.

== Technical data for G7a(TI) torpedo ==
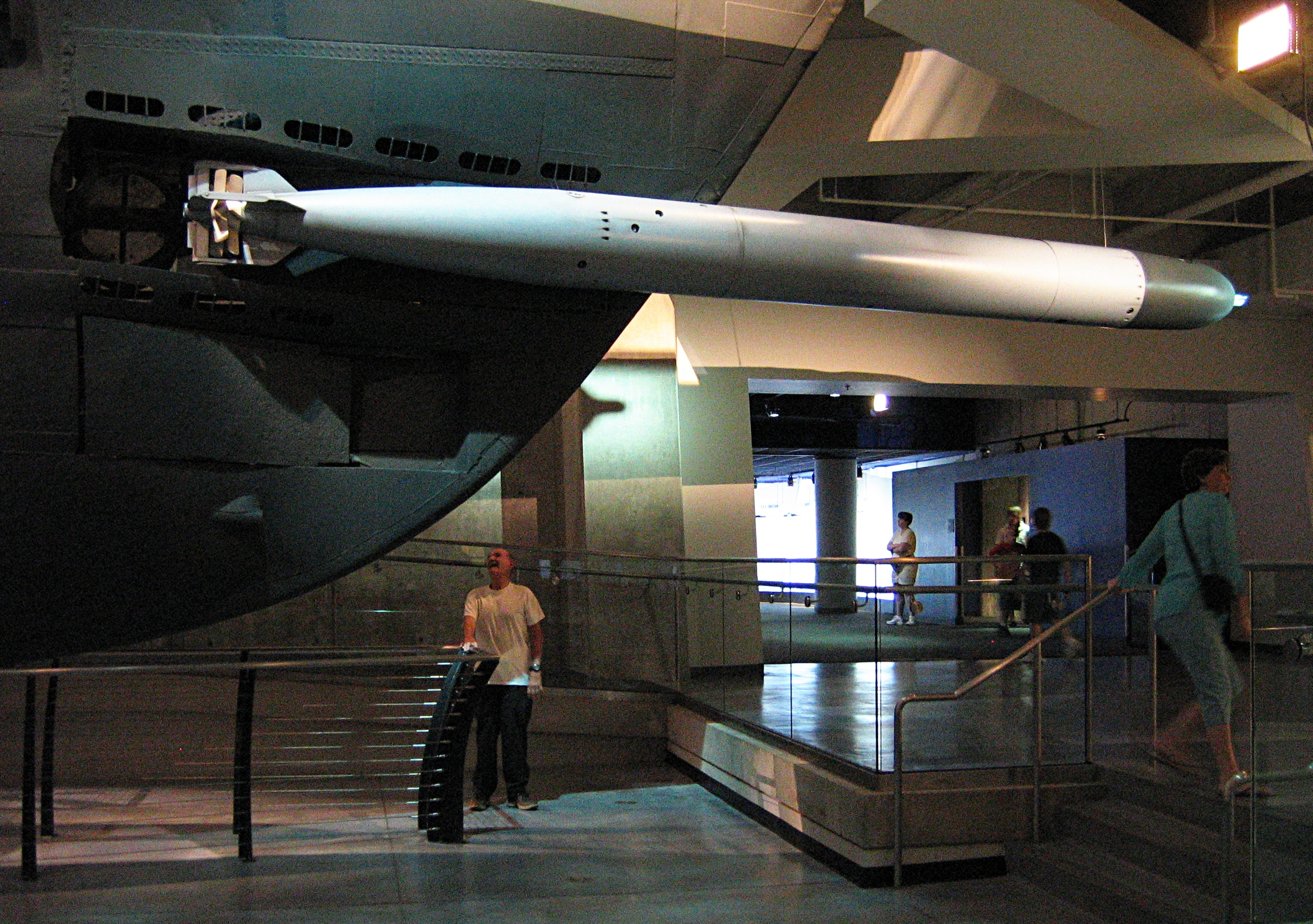
A mockup of G7a(TI) torpedo at the U-505 exhibit, at the Museum of Science and Industry in Chicago, USA.

- Type: Standard, straightrunning torpedo with wet-heater propulsion and whitehead tail
- Design and development: 1928-33 (based on the 50 cm G7v* torpedo)
- Operative service in Kriegsmarine: 1934–1945
- Length, prepared for launch with Ka/Kb warhead and Pi1 pistol): 7163 mm
- Diameter: 533.4 mm (21")
- Weight (prepared for launch with warhead): 1538 kg
- Warhead explosive charge: 250–300 kg of various explosives depending on type of head
- Boostercharge (Pi1/Pi2 pistols): 300 g Pentrite
- Minimum angle of impact to detonate (Pi1/Pi2 pistols, mechanical mode): 16 degrees
- Speed: 30 kn ("Weitschuß", WS) / 40 kn ("Nahschuß", NS) / 44 kn ("Schnellschuß", SS) 1)
- Depthsetting: 1–12 m (TA-I mechanism) or 1–15 m (TA-II mechanism)
- Arming distance (Pi1/Pi2 pistols): 100 m (black impeller) / 150 m (red impeller) / 300 m (blue impeller) 2)
- Propulsion: 4-cylinder steam engine (powered by a mixture of overheated steam and compressed air)
- Fuel: Decaline
- Engine power output: 110 Hp (30 kn) / 255 Hp (40 kn) / 360 Hp (44 kn)
- Engine RPM: 1170 (30 kn) / 1280 (40 kn) / 1470 (44 kn)
- Propeller: 2 × 6-blade (contra-rotating) 3)
- Max running distance: 12000 m (30 kn) / 7500 m (40 kn) / 5000 m (44 kn)
- Air tank capacity: 676 L (200 kg/cm^{2})
- Freshwater compartment: 57 L
- Fueltank: 14.5 L
- Oiltank (engine): 6.5 L
- Oiltank (low-pressure regulator): 0.3 L
- Steering: Mechanical gyroscope powered by pressurised air (GA VIII) with anglesetting mechanism (+/- 90 degrees from initial course after launch)
- Depthcontrol: Hydrostatic mechanism with pendulum (TA-I or TA-II mechanism)

Note 1) 44kn was used only by S-Boote (problems with initial design led to breakdown on engines running 44 kn, so this setting was banned until the new engine was available). Note 2) Black used only from shore torpedo batteries, red from uboats and blue from surface vessels. Note 3) Pre-war produced models had 4-blade propellers.

Post war use: The TI were used post-war by several navies with different modifications and designations (Marina Española: G-7a, Bundesmarine: DM11, Royal Danish Navy: T1 and T1T, Royal Norwegian Navy: T1 and T1 mod 1). Last known operator was RNoN with the T1 mod 1 (G7a with wire-guidance: Although four modifications to the torpedo were carried out over the years – the last with computerised control in 1992 – the same designation "mod 1" was applied throughout its service). In the RNoN, T1 mod 1 was used from FACs (until ca 1995), submarines (until ca 1990) and Coastal artillery shore batteries (until 2001).

Other versions:

- G7a(TI Fat I): TI with Fat I programsteering 1)
- G7a(TI Lut I): TI with Lut I programsteering 1)
- G7a(TI Lut II): TI with Lut II programsteering 1)
- G7a(TIü): TI dedicated for use with Schulboote at U-Flotillen. The torpedo was equipped with the older type depth-mechanism, the lead ballast was removed from the water chamber and a special "light" exercise head was fitted (it was empty, i.e. no water and blowing mechanism). This was done to ensure positive buoyancy at the end of the run. Minor adjustments were also done to the air regulators and combustion chamber to lower the temperature of the drive gas (i.e. mixture of steam and pressurized air). These measures lead to a decrease in range, but achieved the overall goal of significantly fewer incidents of damaged or lost torpedoes, and a higher number of exercise-shots for the crews.
- G7a(TIü Lut II): T1ü with Lut II 2)
- G7a(TIV): TI with changed buoyancy (max air pressure reduced from 200 to 100 kg/cm^{2}) for the Seehund midget submarine, with sinker-mechanism (never fielded).
- G7as: TI with acoustic seeker (never fielded, nor designated a KM torpedonumber)

Note 1) For launch with program setting, speed could only be set to 30 kn. Note 2) For launch with program setting, speed could be set to 30 or 40 kn.

Exercise- and Warheads/pistols used on the TI: Exersiceheads:

- Type 1210 or type 1215 (improved head with dual blow-mechanisms)

Warhead/pistol statutory combinations according to Kriegsmarine regulations:

- Ka, Ka1 or Ka2 with Pi1, Pi1a or Pi1c pistols
- Kc with Pi3 or Pi3c pistols
- Kc1 or Kc2 with Pi3, Pi3a or Pi3c pistols

Warhead/pistol possible (technically) combinations – only on special demand, approved by torpedo-arsenal and with special consideration to depth-settings in order to assure proper function of the pistol:

- Kb or Kb1 with Pi1, Pi1a, Pi1c, Pi2*, Pi2c* or Pi2c* pistols (* only heads with extended pocket)

== See also ==
- G7e torpedo
- List of World War II torpedoes of Germany
