= Foxer =

British World War II acoustic torpedo decoy

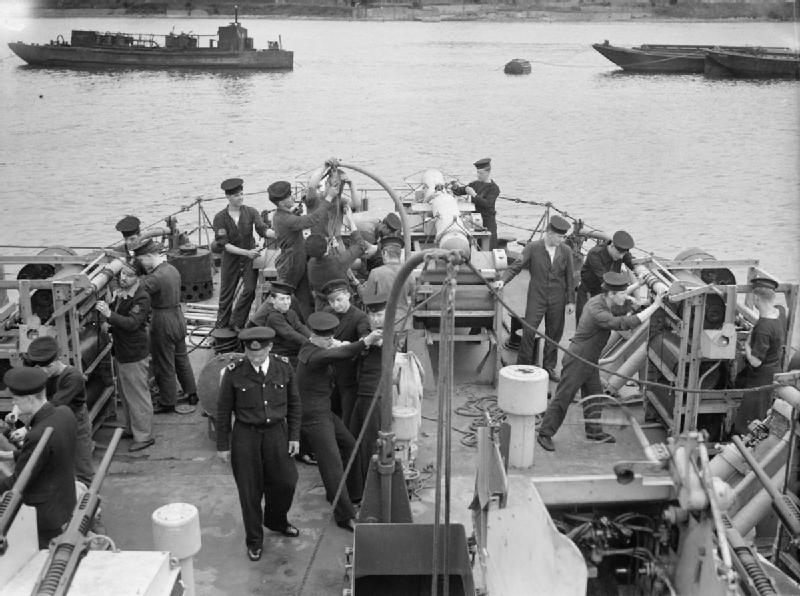
Foxer decoy float resting on the top of the depth charge racks of HMS Hind (U39)

Foxer was the code name for a British-built acoustic decoy used to confuse German acoustic homing torpedoes like the G7 torpedo during the Second World War. A US version codenamed FXR was deployed at the end of September 1943 on all transatlantic escort vessels. A Canadian version was also built called the CAAT (Canadian Anti-Acoustic Torpedo) device. It was later replaced in US service by the Fanfare noisemaker.

The device consisted of one or two noise-making devices towed several hundred metres astern of the ship. The noise makers mechanically generated a far louder cavitation noise than the ship's propellers. This noise decoyed the acoustic torpedoes away from the rear of the ship into a circling pattern around the noise maker (which was too small to strike) until the torpedo ran out of fuel. The noisy Foxer had the disadvantage that it also prevented the ship's own ASDIC from detecting any other U-boat nearby that could approach the convoy.

Nevertheless, the FXR countermeasure proved to be highly effective in decoying German acoustic torpedoes. Of the approximately 700 G7es torpedoes fired, only about 77 hit their target.

== Development ==
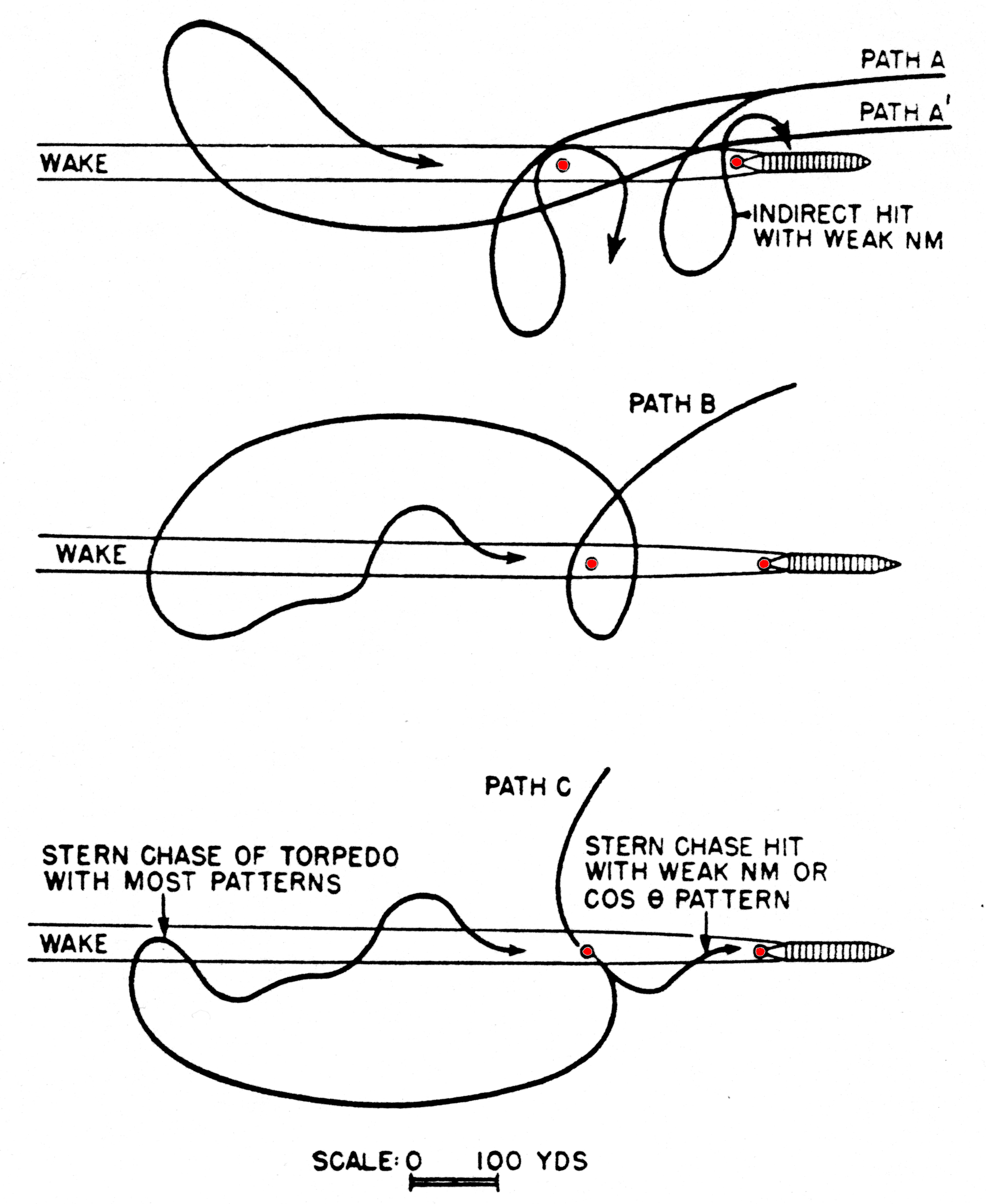
The effectiveness of a single noise-maker towed by a ship travelling at 12 knots.

By 1943 Allied intelligence sources indicated that Germany had produced a passive acoustic homing torpedo, which homed on the sound produced by a ship's propeller as it moved through the water. To counter this threat various countermeasures were considered. There was already a towed noise maker developed to mine-sweep for acoustic mines, consisting of two steel bars fixed parallel, with a gap between them to allow water to flow between, and towed perpendicular to the flow of water. The water flowing between the two bars caused them to flex and bang together generating far more noise than the towing ship above 1 kHz. This noisemaker produced around 20 decibels more noise than the towing ship, and would last for around 25 hours when towed at 12 knots.

The US developed this existing noise-maker into the FXR, which was to be towed singly around 500 feet behind the ship. This entered production by July 1943. The single noise-maker however would work effectively only if the torpedo was equally sensitive to sounds from both the front and rear. If a torpedo passed directly over the noise-maker from the rear the ship itself would be directly ahead, if the torpedo had a reduced sensitivity to noise from behind, it might ignore the greater output from the noise-maker, and proceed to home on the ship.

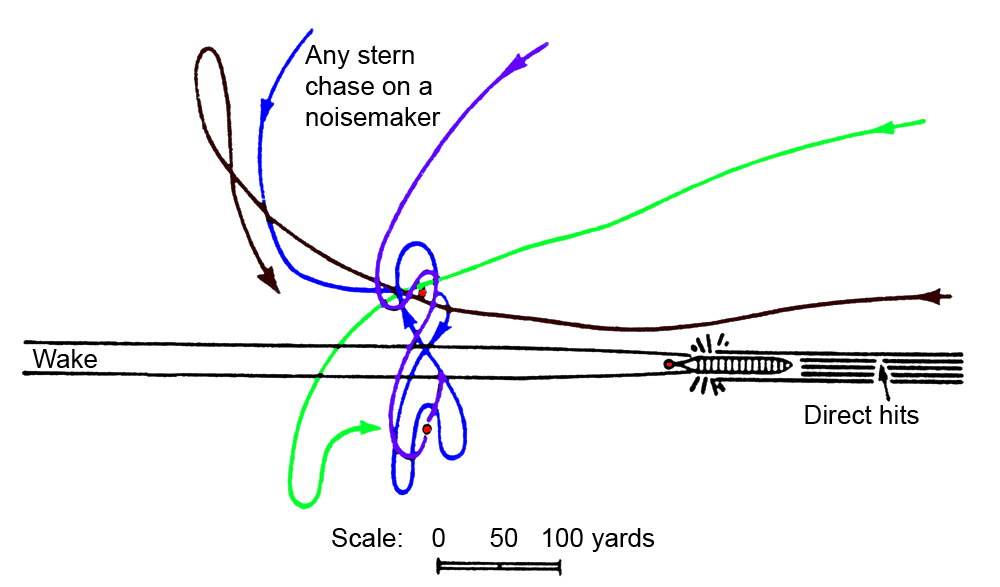
Typical trajectories of German passive acoustic homing torpedoes relative to a ship moving at 16 to 18 knots with two towed noisemakers (shown in red). Similar trajectories from the starboard side.

After successful attacks on ships in Convoy ONS 18 and Convoy ON 22 in which nine ships were sunk, more detailed studies were begun into the torpedo behaviour. These studies revealed that against a torpedo with reduced sensitivity to the rear (described by its sensitivity pattern as a Cosθ torpedo), a single towed noise-maker would not be sufficiently effective.

== Description ==
The Foxer consisted of one or more 3,000 pounds (1,400 kg) arrangements of hollow metal pipes with holes cut in them. These were towed through the water about 200 m (220 yd) behind the ship. The water rushing through the holes and the pipes banging together created cavitation noise, much greater than that coming from the ship's propeller. This worked because the German homing torpedoes were tuned to home in on the sound frequencies generated by cavitation, and on the loudest cavitation sound.

The German U-boat crews called it the Kreissäge (circular saw) or Rattelboje (rattle buoy) and estimated the volume of noise generated by Foxer at 10 to 100 times greater than that generated by a ship.

The limitations of the system were that it could not be towed faster than 14 knots (26 km/h; 16 mph) and because of the noise it effectively rendered the towing ship's sonar useless. The drums also wore out quickly and the sound could be heard underwater over a long distance giving away the position of the towing ship to U-boats searching for convoys.

In the closing stages of the war the Germans developed the T11 Zaunkönig II torpedo, designed to ignore towed decoys and noisemakers. However, it was never actually employed in wartime as Germany had surrendered by the time testing was fully completed.
