= Marder (submarine) =

1944 class of German midget submarines

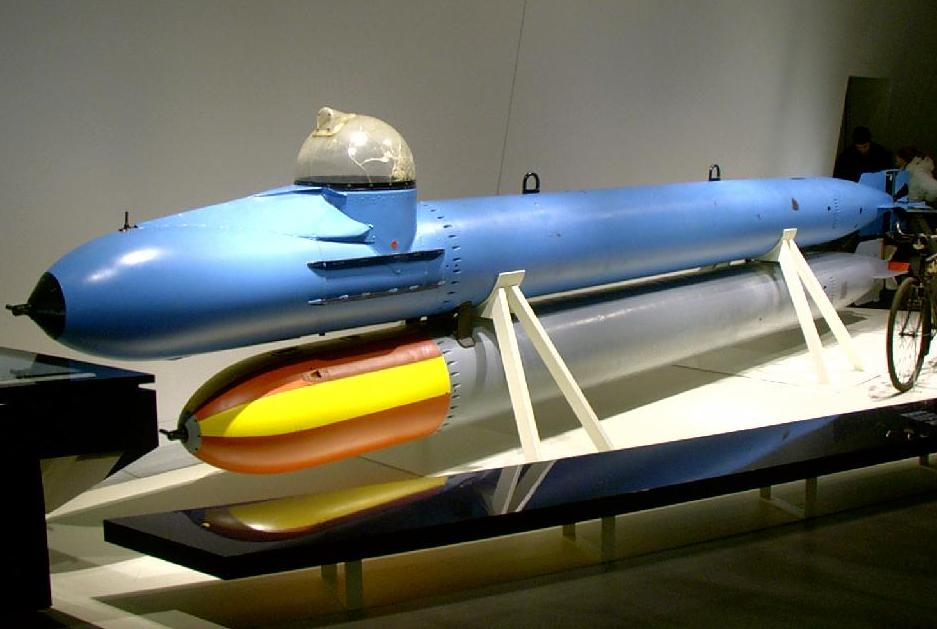
- Marder on display at the Bundeswehr Military History Museum

Class overview
- Name: Marder
- Operators: Kriegsmarine
- Active: c. 500

General characteristics
- Type: Midget submarine
- Length: 8.3 m (27 ft 3 in) o/a
- Beam: 0.533 m (21 in)
- Propulsion: AEG-AV 76 Eto, 12 metric horsepower (8.8 kW; 12 shp)
- Speed: 3.2–4.2 kn (5.9–7.8 km/h; 3.7–4.8 mph)
- Test depth: 40 m (130 ft)
- Complement: 1
- Armament: 1 × 53.3 cm (21 in) torpedo

Marder (pine marten) was a German midget submarine developed from the Neger. The craft was 8.3 metres (27 ft 3 in) long and unlike the Neger included a flooding tank in the nose allowing it to dive. Another improvement was the dome through which the pilot viewed the outside world that also served as the craft's entrance and exit was made openable from the inside. Maximum diving depth was about 25 metres (82 ft).

The submarine's first operations took place on the night of 2 August 1944, when Nazi Germany's Kriegsmarine's Small Battle Units made their largest effort of the war. 58 human torpedoes of the Neger-type and 22 Linse vessels were launched against Allied shipping off Normandy as part of a combined operation with Negers and explosive Linse boats. One Royal Navy destroyer escort, HMS Quorn was sunk by a human torpedo along with one minesweeper, HMS Gairsay, and one landing craft by the German motor boats; at a cost of 41 Neger and 22 Linsen craft.

== Bibliography ==
- Brown, David. Warship Losses of World War Two. Arms and Armour, London, Great Britain, 1990. ISBN 0-85368-802-8.
- Prenatt, Jamie & Stille, Mark (2014). Axis Midget Submarines: 1939–45. Oxford, UK: Osprey Publishing. ISBN 978-1-4728-0122-7.
