= G7es torpedo =

Torpedo of the German Navy

G7es(TV) torpedo
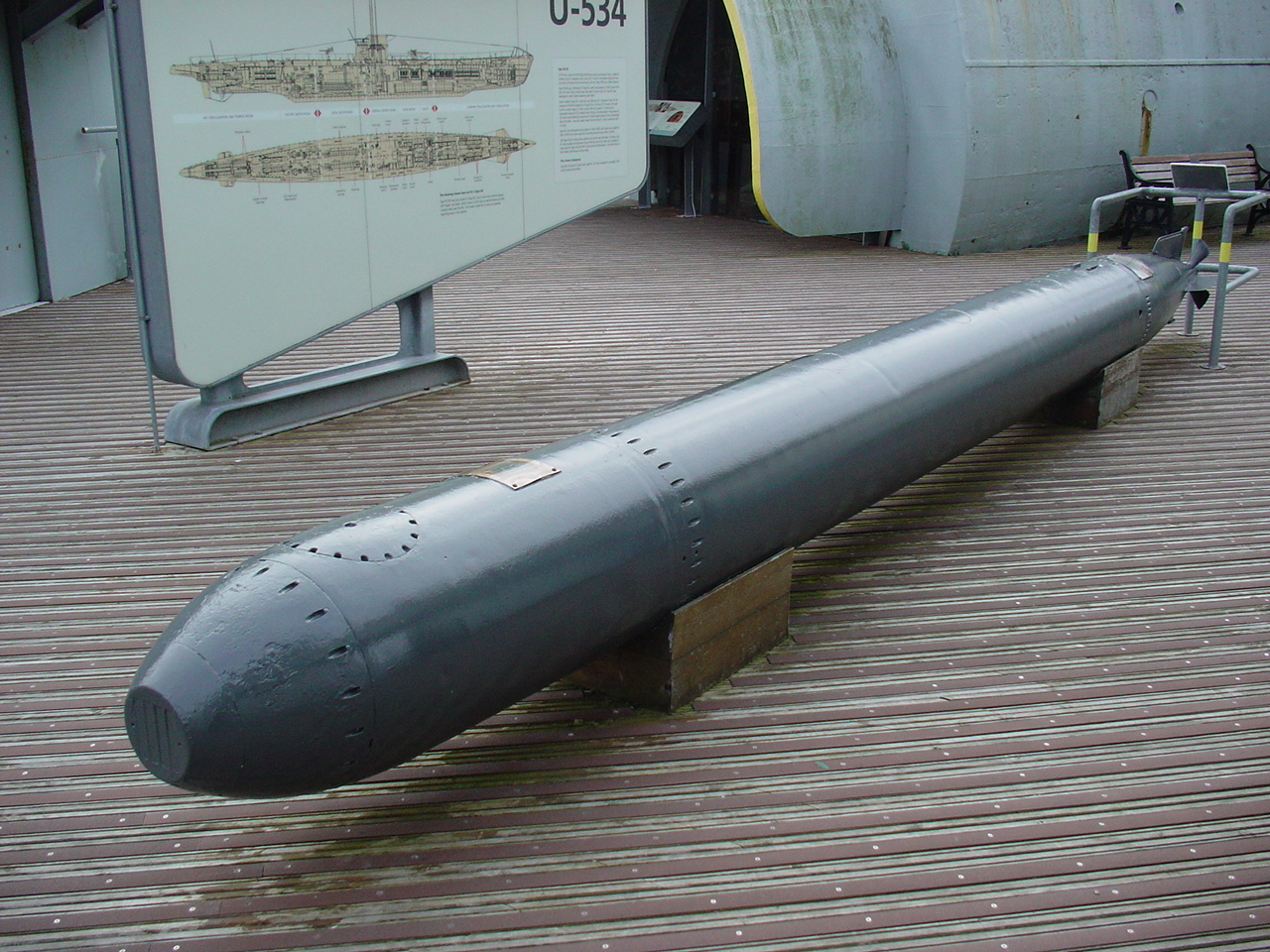
- A torpedo built by combining parts from TV and TIII torpedoes recovered from the wreck, exhibited alongside U-534 at Woodside Ferry, Birkenhead.
- Type: Heavyweight anti-surface ship torpedo
- Place of origin: Nazi Germany

Service history
- In service: 1943
- Used by: Kriegsmarine
- Wars: World War II

Production history
- Produced: 1943-1945

Specifications
- Mass: 1,495 kg (3,296 lb)
- Length: 7.163 m (23.50 ft)
- Diameter: 534.5 mm (21.04 in)
- Warhead weight: 274 kg (604 lb)
- Engine: Electric batteries
- Operational range: 5,700 m (3.1 nmi)
- Maximum speed: 24 kn (44 km/h)

The G7es(TV), was a passive acoustic torpedo developed by Germany during World War II. The basic design was a development of the straight-running G7e(TIII), equipped with an acoustic homing seeker head developed by Atlas Werke.In accordance with established practice, it was assigned the codename "Zaunkönig" during development (English: Wren)It got the nickname GNAT (acronym for German Navy Acoustic Torpedo) by the British.

== Description ==
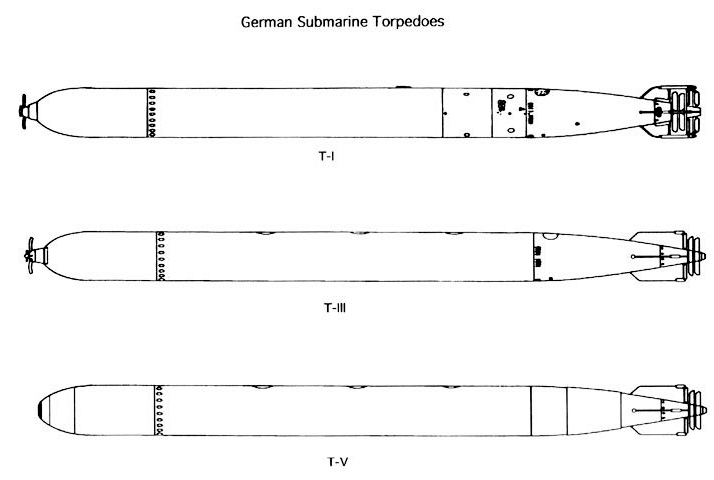
Diagram of various German submarine torpedoes: TI, TIII & TV

The forerunner of the TV was the TIV which was introduced in January 1943. While initially restricted in its use, after several modifications, the TIV was ready for general operational use on 1 July 1943. However, the TIV saw limited use as a result of the introduction of the TV in August 1943..

The TV torpedo was capable of travelling at 24 knots (44 km/h) and had an effective range of about 5000 metres against convoy escorts vessels proceeding at speeds between 10 (18 km/h) and 18 knots (33 km/h). The homing system consisted of hydrophone receivers and altered the direction of the rudder via an electropneumatic device. The acoustic homing torpedo was specifically designed to be attracted by the pitch of an escort's propellers and — even if aimed inaccurately — to explode under the ship's stern.

There were five variants of the passive acoustic seeker mounted in front of the warhead:

- The initial round-nosed version "25 degree storch" which contained two magnetostriction hydrophones inside a funnel-shaped baffle
- The later flat-nosed versions "vierfach storch" which contained four sets of magnetostriction hydrophones which came in four different arrangements.

== Variants ==
=== Germany ===
- TIV: the first operational torpedo with acoustic homing (only 30 produced, taken out of service after 3 months in september 1943)
- TV: improved TIV, entered service in september 1943.
- TVa: TV variant for use by Küsten U-Boote (cancelled project) and Schnellboote.
- TVb: TV variant for use against submarines (never fielded).
- TXI: improved version of the TV. It had several modifications, including improvements to help the torpedo bypass enemy decoys and be less vulnerable to false echoes, as well as extended range from 5700 m to 7000m and the ability to be used against following targets by U-Boats without rear tubes.

=== Soviet Union ===
- SAET-50: first acoustic homing torpedo of the Soviet Union and based on the German TV torpedo. The torpedo was developed as a result of Soviet engineers gaining access to German torpedo technology during and after the Second World War. The SAET-50 entered service in 1950. Later modified with an improved battery; this torpedo entered service in 1955 as SAET-50M.

== Use ==
The acoustic homing torpedo required a minimum distance of 400 metres (1,300 ft) to lock onto the target after launch. The detection range of the hydrophones varied significantly according to circumstance, but 450 m (500 yards) was considered reasonable for a ship moving at 15 knots. After at least one unconfirmed instance of a U-boat (U-972) sinking after being hit by its own torpedo, and another circle-back that forced the U-862 to crash-dive, the BdU ordered submarines to dive to 60 metres (200 ft) and go completely silent after launching acoustic torpedoes, to minimize the risk.

The first 80 TVs were delivered on 1 August 1943, and the weapon was first used in a large-scale maneuver against the North Atlantic convoys ONS 18/ON 202 in late September 1943. The commanders reported a number of torpedo strikes and recorded the sinking of nine commercial steamers and 12 escort ships after the battle. In fact, only six merchant ships and three escort vessels, a destroyer, a frigate and a corvette, were sunk. However, despite some initial success, in particular sinking destroyers and corvettes, the TVs effectiveness was quickly nullified by the introduction of a noise making decoy known as Foxer. The NDRC worked on countermeasures to an acoustic torpedo long before its introduction by the Germans. At the end of September 1943, it was promptly installed on all transatlantic escort vessels.

Grossadmiral Karl Dönitz, not satisfied with the development of countermeasures, realized that his brief success against the North Atlantic trade convoys was only a flare up and recorded:

[it is] finally clear that surface warfare for U-boats had come to an end. It was now a matter of filling in time till the new type should be ready for action.

In spite of highly effective Allied countermeasures, a total of ca 650 TVs were fired in combat, sinking 77 ships.

== See also ==
- G7e torpedo
- List of World War II torpedoes of Germany
