= K-Verband =

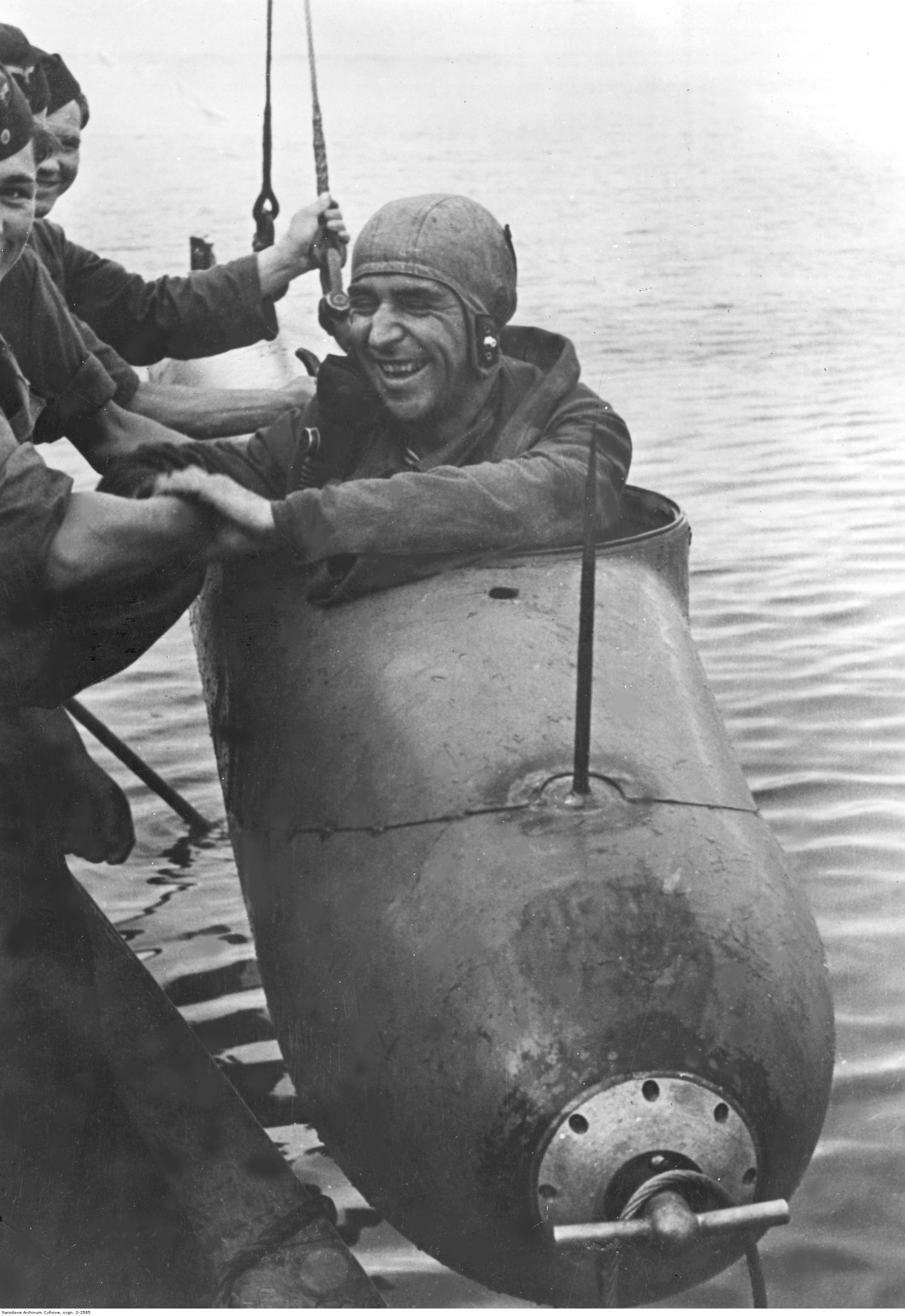
Senior sailor Walter Gerhold - pilot of a one-man torpedo boat, the so-called "live torpedo", after the action.

The K-Verband (German Kleinkampfverbände der Kriegsmarine, "small battle units") was a World War II German naval unit that operated a mixture of midget submarines and explosive speed boats. It was formed in April 1944 and operated until 26 April 1945.

The miniature submarines were a mix of one and two-man craft. The Linsen explosive motorboats were operated in units of three with two boats carrying 660-800 lb of explosives and a third tasked with remotely controlling them during their final attack run.

== Bibliography ==
- Tarrant, V.E (1994). The Last Year of the Kriegsmarine. Arms and Armour Press. ISBN 1-85409-176-X.
