= German submarine U-778 =

German World War II submarine

History

Nazi Germany
- Name: U-778
- Ordered: 20 January 1941
- Builder: Kriegsmarinewerft Wilhelmshaven
- Yard number: 161
- Laid down: 3 July 1943
- Launched: 6 May 1944
- Commissioned: 7 July 1944
- Fate: Surrendered on 9 May 1945; scuttled as part of Operation Deadlight on 4 December 1945

General characteristics
- Class & type: Type VIIC submarine
- Displacement: 769 tonnes (757 long tons) surfaced; 871 t (857 long tons) submerged
- Length: 67.10 m (220 ft 2 in) o/a; 50.50 m (165 ft 8 in) pressure hull
- Beam: 6.20 m (20 ft 4 in) o/a; 4.70 m (15 ft 5 in) pressure hull
- Height: 9.60 m (31 ft 6 in)
- Draught: 4.74 m (15 ft 7 in)
- Installed power: 2,800–3,200 PS (2,100–2,400 kW; 2,800–3,200 bhp) (diesels); 750 PS (550 kW; 740 shp) (electric)
- Propulsion: 2 shafts; 2 × diesel engines; 2 × electric motors
- Speed: 17.7 knots (32.8 km/h; 20.4 mph) surfaced; 7.6 knots (14.1 km/h; 8.7 mph) submerged
- Range: 8,500 nmi (15,700 km; 9,800 mi) at 10 knots (19 km/h; 12 mph) surfaced; 80 nmi (150 km; 92 mi) at 4 knots (7.4 km/h; 4.6 mph) submerged
- Test depth: 230 m (750 ft); Crush depth: 250–295 m (820–968 ft)
- Complement: 4 officers, 40–56 enlisted
- Armament: 5 × 53.3 cm (21 in) torpedo tubes (four bow, one stern); 14 × torpedoes; 1 × 3.7 cm (1.5 in) Flak M42 AA gun; 2 × twin 2 cm (0.79 in) C/30 anti-aircraft guns

Service record
- Part of: 31st U-boat Flotilla; 7 July 1944 – 28 February 1945; 11th U-boat Flotilla; 1 March – 8 May 1945
- Identification codes: M 33 584
- Commanders: Oblt.z.S. / Kptlt. Ralf Jürs; 7 July 1944 – 9 May 1945
- Operations: 1 patrol: 4 – 26 March 1945
- Victories: None

German submarine U-778 was a Type VIIC U-boat built for Nazi Germany's Kriegsmarine in World War II. She only completed one combat patrol and sank no Allied ships. She was surrendered to the Allies at Bergen on 9 May 1945.

== Design ==
German Type VIIC submarines were preceded by the shorter Type VIIB submarines. U-778 had a displacement of 769 tonnes (757 long tons) when at the surface and 871 tonnes (857 long tons) while submerged. She had a total length of 67.10 m (220 ft 2 in), a pressure hull length of 50.50 m (165 ft 8 in), a beam of 6.20 m (20 ft 4 in), a height of 9.60 m (31 ft 6 in), and a draught of 4.74 m (15 ft 7 in). The submarine was powered by two Germaniawerft F46 four-stroke, six-cylinder supercharged diesel engines producing a total of 2,800 to 3,200 metric horsepower (2,060 to 2,350 kW; 2,760 to 3,160 shp) for use while surfaced, two Garbe, Lahmeyer & Co. RP 137/c double-acting electric motors producing a total of 750 metric horsepower (550 kW; 740 shp) for use while submerged. She had two shafts and two 1.23 m (4 ft) propellers. The boat was capable of operating at depths of up to 230 metres (750 ft).

The submarine had a maximum surface speed of 17.7 knots (32.8 km/h; 20.4 mph) and a maximum submerged speed of 7.6 knots (14.1 km/h; 8.7 mph). When submerged, the boat could operate for 80 nautical miles (150 km; 92 mi) at 4 knots (7.4 km/h; 4.6 mph); when surfaced, she could travel 8,500 nautical miles (15,700 km; 9,800 mi) at 10 knots (19 km/h; 12 mph). U-778 was fitted with five 53.3 cm (21 in) torpedo tubes (four fitted at the bow and one at the stern), fourteen torpedoes, one 3.7 cm (1.5 in) Flak M42 and two twin 2 cm (0.79 in) C/30 anti-aircraft guns. The boat had a complement of between forty-four and sixty.

== Service history ==
The boat arrived at Horten in Norway on 28 February 1945 under the command of Oberleutnant zur See Ralf Jürs. She left Horten on her only war patrol on 4 March, completing the 23-day patrol on the 26 March 1945 at Bergen in Norway. No ships were sunk during the patrol and the U-boat was still at Bergen when she was surrendered to the Allies some six weeks later on 9 May 1945.

On 4 December 1945, she was being towed offshore by the Royal Navy, to be scuttled as part of Operation Deadlight, but foundered and sank before reaching the scuttling ground, at a point 55°32′N 7°7′W, 16 nautical miles (30 km; 18 mi) North East of Malin Head in around 70 metres (230 ft) of water.

== Proposed salvage ==
The wreck was rediscovered by marine archaeologist Innes McCartney in 2001. In 2007, Derry City Council announced plans to raise the boat to be the main exhibit of a new maritime museum. Many of the other Operation Deadlight U-boats were used for target practice and sunk by gunfire, torpedoes, rockets or bombs. U-778, by contrast, is remarkably intact and lies in relatively shallow water.

On 3 October 2007 an Irish diver, Michael Hanrahan, died whilst filming the wreck as part of the salvage project. In November 2009, a spokesman from the council's heritage museum service announced the salvage project had been cancelled for cost reasons.

== See also ==
- German submarine U-505
- German submarine U-534 - salvaged in 1993.
- German submarine U-995

== Bibliography ==
- Busch, Rainer; Röll, Hans-Joachim (1999). German U-boat commanders of World War II : a biographical dictionary. Translated by Brooks, Geoffrey. London, Annapolis, Md: Greenhill Books, Naval Institute Press. ISBN 1-55750-186-6.
- Busch, Rainer; Röll, Hans-Joachim (1999). Der U-Boot-Krieg, 1939-1945: Deutsche U-Boot-Verluste von September 1939 bis Mai 1945 [German U-boat losses from September 1939 to May 1945] (in German). Vol. IV. Hamburg, Berlin, Bonn: Mittler. ISBN 3-8132-0514-2.
- Gröner, Eric; Jung, Dieter; Maass, Martin (1991). German Warships 1815-1945: U-boats and Mine Warfare Vessels. Vol. 2. Translated by Thomas, Keith; Magowan, Rachel. London: Conway Maritime Press. ISBN 0-85177-593-4.
