= Camp Ruston =

Camp Ruston was one of the largest prisoner-of-war camps in the United States during World War II, with 4,315 prisoners at its peak in October 1943. Camp Ruston served as the "base camp" and had 8 smaller work branch camps associated to it. Camp Ruston included three large, separated compounds for POWs, a full, modern hospital compound, and a compound for the American personnel. One of the POW compounds, located in the far northwestern part of the camp, was designated for POW officers. The officer's compound's barracks were constructed to house a lesser number of POWs, affording more privacy and room for the officers. The enlisted men's barracks were designed to house a maximum of 50 POWs in two rows of bunks that ran along each side. POW latrines were separate buildings located at the end of each compound.

== Construction and WAC use ==
Camp Ruston was built by the local T.L. James Company under the supervision of the U.S. Army Corps of Engineers on 770 acres (3.1 km^{2}) about seven miles (11 km) west of Ruston, Louisiana in 1942. The land was purchased for $24,200, and the construction cost $2.5 million. Camp Ruston was originally designated as an "Enemy Alien Internment Camp", a detention facility for internees of Japanese ancestry. Plans for the internment of enemy aliens that may have also included internees of German and Italian ancestry never developed, and the need for additional enemy alien internment camps were abandoned. It soon became evident that Camp Ruston's usage plan would change due to the unexpected number of POWs being housed in Europe needing to be transferred.

Because few German prisoners of war in the United States as yet existed, the camp served first as a training center for the Women's Army Corps. In April 1943, the first 500 recruits arrived for basic training, forming the 42nd Women's Army Auxiliary Corps Regiment. Approximately 2,000 WACs were trained at the camp over three and one-half months. By July 1943, the WAC training center was moved to make room for the expected large numbers of POW's captured in the European and Northern African Theaters.

== POW camp ==
- Ruston P. O. W. Camp Buildings
- U.S. National Register of Historic Places
- Location within Louisiana Location within the United States
- Location: In Grambling State University West Campus, 2776 LA 150
- Nearest city: Ruston, Louisiana
- Coordinates: 32°32′05″N 92°44′27″W
- Area: less than one acre
- Built: 1943
- NRHP reference No.: 91001825
- Added to NRHP: December 13, 1991

The first 300 POWs, from Field Marshal Erwin Rommel's elite Afrika Korps, arrived at Camp Ruston in August 1943. By October 1943, the camp reached a peak population of 4,315 prisoners, including 181 officers. After the three original compounds were filled, a fourth for officers only was built. The prisoners were perhaps the most ethnically diverse ever seen in Louisiana; besides Germans, captured soldiers of French, Austrian, Italian, Czech, Polish, Yugoslav, and Romanian nationalities, and over 100 Russian prisoners were also housed in the camp. One report describes several German soldiers with "Mongol features" and that they required special diets in keeping with their Islamic faith. It was later learned that these "Muhammadans" were from Chechnya.

Declassified memos from the Russian POWs to the camp commander indicated that while the Russians were prisoners, they volunteered to fight against the Japanese for the Americans. Their request was denied by the Americans, and the fate of these Russian POWs became one of the most unusual stories of Camp Ruston. During the meeting at Yalta, Stalin specifically mentioned these Russian POWs held at Camp Ruston and requested their return to Russia. The US agreed to send these POWs back to Russia and eventually transferred them from Camp Ruston to Camp Dix in New Jersey for their trip home. The Russian POWs, who fought against Russia as German soldiers, knew their fate if they were to return. Records and news accounts indicate that the Russians rioted and started fires in their barracks at Camp Dix to protest. Two Russian POWs hanged themselves from the barrack rafters rather than face their inevitable fate. After leaving Camp Dix, the trail and story of the remaining Russian POWs from Camp Ruston mysteriously end.

One group of prisoners was treated differently, with not even International Red Cross inspectors allowed to see them. In late July 1944, the captured surviving 56 officers and crew of U-505 were sent to the camp and kept in isolation in a restricted area in the NE corner of the camp to prevent them from communicating to the enemy that secret German naval codes had fallen into Allied hands. Numerous declassified secret National Archive documents regarding these U-boat POWs are housed in the archives. A copy of Captain Harold Lange's log of the U-505's voyage can be found in the archives at Louisiana Tech University. The last entry in the log suggests that Lange actually pre-wrote the evening's entry earlier and before the capture, as his entry stated that on the evening of the 4th, everything was calm. The U-505 had been captured earlier in the day of June 4.

Records indicate that one American was kept as a POW at Camp Ruston. Ludwig Staudinger Jr. was born in Germany in 1921. His family left Germany and immigrated to the west coast of the US near Yakima, Washington. As the war in Europe began, the young German American's allegiance to his mother country drew him into joining the German army prior to America's entry into the war. He left Yakima and fought in the early years of the war. Staudinger was captured by the English and eventually, this naturalized American, fighting for his mother country, found himself a German POW in his naturalized country.

A Luftwaffe prisoner stated that while the camp was tough, compared to German standards, it was like a vacation. During their incarceration in Camp Ruston, the prisoners benefited from food, medical care, and physical surroundings that were better than what their countrymen were experiencing at home. They ate the same food as their captors; perhaps even better, as several experienced cooks were among them. Prisoners were permitted to purchase snacks and personal items at a canteen, engage in athletic and craft activities, and organize an orchestra, a theater, and a library; KWKH broadcast a concert by the prisoners.

Enlisted prisoners were required to work at the camp and for farms and businesses across north Louisiana. They picked cotton, felled timber, built roads, and performed other tasks to help solve the domestic labor shortage caused by the war; cotton picking was perhaps the most difficult. They were paid in scrip which they could use in the camp canteen. There are numerous accounts of POWs and locals meeting and becoming "friends" during their stay. Officers were not required to work but could if they desired. One such case involved Hans Stollenwerk, an Afrika Corp lieutenant, who worked as an assistant to one of the camp's civilian accountants. Stollenwork's art had been given to the accountant as he left Camp Ruston. The artwork was found in an old barn near Arcadia, Louisiana and donated to the Camp Ruston Foundation nearly 50 years later.

In 1944, the War Department began a program to educate prisoners of war throughout the United States in academic subjects and democratic values. One source of books was the library of Louisiana Polytechnic Institute (now Louisiana Tech University). Some prisoners even took correspondence courses from major American universities. Many of the prisoners cite this instruction as the beginning of Democracy in post-war Germany. Contrary to several poorly researched books and videos made about Camp Ruston, the POWs did not wear their military uniforms during their internment. There were several occasions where POWs were photographed posing in their national uniform for Christmas cards and funerals, but these occasions were very rare at Camp Ruston. Each POW was issued WWI US surplus khaki uniforms with the letters "PW" painted on the back of each shirt and coat, as well as the front pant legs of their trousers. This fact was corroborated during interviews of American guards as well as numerous former POWs. A POW-issued uniform was donated by a former POW to the Camp Ruston Foundation and is now located in the archives.

Only 34 prisoners escaped and remained free for over 24 hours, and only one was never recaptured. The most famous escape was performed by a German soldier named Charly King. Born on Christmas Day in 1921, King, then 24 years old, spoke perfect German, English, as well as Spanish, and was said to be well educated, possibly an engineer or an architect. He managed to escape from one of Camp Ruston's branch camps at Bastrop, La. and eventually made his way to neutral Mexico, where he spent several months. In Mexico, King was involved in a serious truck accident where he spent several months recuperating from his injuries. He eventually hopped a ship back to Germany. According to one of his American guards, King was a pleasant prisoner whom the American guards liked and respected. Based on a Spione interview, the guard remembered that Charly had told him that he needed to return to Germany in order to take care of his mother, whom he feared would fall into Russian hands. The F.B.I. continued to search for him for many years.

At least nine prisoners died at Camp Ruston, including a Russian Major. These deaths resulted from previous wounds and illnesses, or, in one case, from an attack by other prisoners. A small cemetery, located at the northeast tip of the property, near what is now the eastbound lane of Interstate 20, remained until all the buried POWs were exhumed and returned to their countries. An unusual story regarding POW deaths occurred when a German POW died at the camp. The Germans requested that the German/Nazi flag be draped over his coffin for his funeral. There were no Nazi flags available when one female civilian American employee, Myra Roberts of Ruston, sewed a Nazi flag for the funeral. The flag was kept by Roberts for many years, but was misplaced before it could be saved for the archives. It was also noted that a Russian major had died of a heart attack and was buried in the cemetery.

The last prisoners left Camp Ruston on 3 February 1946 for repatriation to their native countries, and the camp was closed in June 1946. Most of the POWs, however, were not immediately repatriated to their native countries for fear of "dumping" all these trained soldiers back into their defeated countries. Many were kept up to two additional years in camps in England, Belgium, and France before being repatriated. Interviews indicated that for many, those two years at the hands of their European holders were much worse than their experiences at Camp Ruston. Contrary to some beliefs, only a few POWs remained in the US. The vast majority of POWs were shipped back to Europe and eventually back to their respective countries. A relatively small number of prisoners who were deemed important to the US and wished to stay were offered the opportunity.

One story of a POW remaining in the US was that of Ensign Karl Ernst Pfaff. Pfaff was a 21-year-old ensign aboard the German U-boat 234. The U-boat's destination was Japan and was under direct orders from Hitler not to surrender. However, on May 14, 1945, 7 days after the German surrender, the U-234 chose to surrender to the US Navy. The U-234 was a treasure trove of information for the US. Loaded on the sub were detailed plans for rockets, a jet plane in a crate, as well as over 500 Kilos of Uranium Oxide. Additionally, two high-ranking Japanese military officers were on board. They committed suicide rather than being captured. Pfaff, who was a trained engineer and spoke English, was able to help the Americans locate the Uranium, which was hidden in a false wall surrounding the conning tower of the sub. According to interviews conducted by Vincent Spione, Pfaff was allowed to stay in the US, gain citizenship, and flourish in business until he died in the early 2000s. He had been removed from the rest of the U-234 crew, who were sent to Papago Park, AZ, while Pfaff was sent to Camp Ruston. After securing a job with a major US manufacturing firm, Pfaff recalls visiting the site of his former POW experience on several occasions. Mark Scalia later recounts the capture of the U-234 in his book, Germany's Last Mission to Japan.

From 1947 to 1958, the site of the camp served as a state tuberculosis sanatorium, and in 1959, it became the Ruston Developmental Center, a facility for the mentally disabled. Much of the area once populated by prisoner barracks is now part of a livestock facility for Louisiana Tech University. The remaining hospital compound barracks are located next to a student housing complex administered by Grambling State University. As of 2007 only two dilapidated buildings remain, and rough outlines on the ground of others.

A number of former POWs eventually returned to the US as immigrants after their return to their native countries. Most of the prisoners had established amicable relationships with the American personnel at the camp and with the local people for whom they worked. Over the years, former prisoners returned to Ruston, and in 1984, a number of them joined local residents in a 40th-anniversary reunion. In 1995, several former POWs returned to Ruston to participate in the Camp Ruston Symposium. During their stay, they confirmed the friendships they had made in Ruston during the war.

== Camp Ruston documentation project ==
In the 1990s, increased efforts were undertaken to preserve the history of Camp Ruston by the state of Louisiana. The project was overseen and led by Vincent Spione. Spione had been working on collecting interviews and artifacts of the camp since meeting a visiting former POW in the summer of 1980. Spione also founded and acted as the president of the non-profit Camp Ruston Foundation. On December 13, 1991, the camp's remaining buildings were placed on the National Register of Historic Places, by the state of Louisiana. The four remaining buildings, as well as the site, did not meet the initial requirements for approval due to the site being under the 50-year-old mark. Spione petitioned the committee to waive this requirement for fear that the buildings would be dismantled, and was successful in convincing the committee to approve the building and site for inclusion into the NHR. In 1994, Spione worked with Louisiana Tech University and the Ruston Developmental Center to begin the Camp Ruston Documentation Project to collect historical materials concerning Camp Ruston. Funded by the Camp Ruston Foundation and Mercedes-Benz, Spione traveled to Germany, Italy, and Yugoslavia, where he interviewed numerous former POWs who were housed at Camp Ruston. He had also met with numerous former POWs, camp civilians, and military staff as they visited the former site from 1977 until he left Ruston in 2000. His interviews, as well as numerous artifacts given to him by the POW's now reside in the Louisiana Tech University archives for safekeeping and to be used by future scholars. Beginning in the late '70s until 2000, Spione continued to manage the project for the Developmental Center. Over those years, numerous documents, photographs, paintings, carvings, letters, oral histories, and many other artifacts were collected and kept at the center. A major donation by Mark Scalia of all the National Archive records pertaining to Camp Ruston proved invaluable for researchers. In 2000, all of the collected artifacts were transferred to the Louisiana Tech University archives for their safekeeping by the Camp Ruston Foundation and Ruston Developmental Center.

During 1994–95, several events and activities were held, which brought attention to Camp Ruston. These included an archaeological survey of the Camp Ruston site, conducted by Mark Scalia, a Tech graduate student. The archaeological exercise proved to be valuable in its finding of several significant artifacts, such as a stone castle built by the German POWs, as well as pinpointing and mapping the actual remnants of the original guard towers and water tower. Additional attention in the form of symposiums, talks to regional historical organizations and to schools, appearances on local and national television, exhibits, slide presentations, and provision of material for a taped segment on Camp Ruston for the LPB-TV program “Louisiana: The State We’re In,” added to the interests of Camp Ruston during that period. Several news stories of POWs visiting the site were produced by CBS News, as well as international documentaries produced by South German Television and Austrian TV. Spione's visit to the former Yugoslavia, where he conducted rare interviews with former POWs, was documented by the Slovenian newspapers in an extensive story outlining the POW experience as conscripted Yugoslavian soldiers in the German army. A copy of the news story is housed in the archives.

In 2007, a second story was produced by LPB on Camp Ruston.

In 1998, Spione reviewed declassified National Archives records that listed the capture and internment records of the crew of the captured U-505. It was already known that the crew was kept incommunicado at Camp Ruston, but the Museum of Science and Industry in Chicago, where the U-505 is displayed, had no records of this. The museum had indicated that their information had the crew being kept as POWs in Bermuda. This is true as the captured mariners were initially taken to Bermuda, but for only a brief time, when they were secretly moved and kept in the far eastern compound of Camp Ruston. Spione shared these declassified documents with the curator of the museum's U-505 exhibit. When the museum updated the exhibit, they made the appropriate changes that now reflect the updated and more accurate information regarding the 505 crew and their internment at Camp Ruston.

In September 2000, the Camp Ruston Foundation transferred all the remaining documents and artifacts from the Developmental Center to the archives at Louisiana Tech for safekeeping and future access by researchers. The records and physical artifacts related to Camp Ruston continue to grow in the archives maintained by the Special Collections Department at Louisiana Tech University. Of the remaining buildings from the camp, only several from the original hospital compound and a warehouse remain; however, the owners, the state of Louisiana, have done little to preserve or protect them, and recent photographs indicate that they are in very poor condition. All the original POW barracks and compound buildings were demolished not long after the POWs left.

== Prominent former POWs ==
Many of the soldiers interned at Camp Ruston had occupations prior to the war, such as doctors, engineers, professors, artists, and famous writers. Among those to achieve notoriety after the war were:

- Heinz Lettau - Luftwaffe [Air Force] major during the war, Lettau emigrated to the U.S. and became one of America's preeminent meteorologists and a professor of physics at the University of Wisconsin.
- Alfred Andersch - an Army soldier who deserted to U.S. forces in Italy, Andersch became Germany's controversial modern novelist. Andersch wrote his only known non-fiction story, "In Memory of Captain Fleisher," a true account of his friendship and memories of the Jewish POW camp doctor with whom Andersch became friends while interned at the camp.
- Hans Goebeler - perhaps the most well-known member of the U-505 crew, Goebeler emigrated to the U.S. after the war. He was a fixture at U-boat events and war memorabilia shows. Goebeler recorded his experiences on the U-505 crew and in Camp Ruston in Steel Boats, Iron Hearts: A U-boat Crewman's Life Aboard U-505 [Savas Beatie LLC, 2004]. Spione interviewed Goebeler in Ruston. The oral interview records are now located in the LA. Tech Archives.
- Karl Pfaff - German naval ensign on the U-234, who was captured and surrendered to the US Navy on 14 May 1945, seven days after Germany surrendered. The U-234 was on a mission to deliver secret weapons and plans to the Japanese, who were still at war with the US. Pfaff cooperated with the US authorities and helped them locate a hidden stash of Uranium Oxide on the U-234. Pfaff was separated from the rest of the crew and sent to Camp Ruston. Pfaff was one of the rare POWs who was allowed to stay in the US without returning to Germany.
- Hans Stollenwerk - a young Afrika Corp tank Lieutenant. captured in North Africa. He later returned to Cologne, Germany, to establish a successful manufacturing business in Cologne. During his time at Camp Ruston, Stollenwerk drew numerous pictures of automobiles from his childhood. Nearly fifty years after Stollenwerk left Camp Ruston, Vincent Spione was able to find several of his drawings. Spione informed Stollenwerk of this find, sent him copies of the drawing just days prior to Stollenwerk's death. Spione and Stollenwerk had met in the summer of 1980 while Stollenwerk visited the grounds of the former camp.
- Cesare Puelli - An Italian officer serving in the elite Italian Officers' Corps. He was captured in Northern Africa. He was interned at Camp Ruston for part of his POW experience. Puelli was an intellectual and art professor in Italy. Puelli participated in the Camp Ruston symposium and donated numerous items to the Camp Ruston Foundation, which are now located at the LA Tech archives. Puelli participated in numerous Camp Ruston Italian POW reunions, which were held in Italy.
- Earnst Paul - One of the several German POWs who died at the camp and were buried at Camp Ruston. His body was exhumed and returned to Germany after the war.
- Horst Blumberg- A German Navy sailor, Blumenberg was captured when his U-boat U-664 was attacked by Allied aircraft. Because he cooperated with American authorities, he was separated from the rest of the crew and interned at Camp Ruston. He was considered a problem prisoner with several escape attempts. After the war, he emigrated to the U.S. Blumenberg returned to Ruston several times during his later years and donated several items to the Camp Ruston collection at Louisiana Tech University. Blumenberg's oral history of his dramatic capture and time at Camp Ruston may be found in the archives.

== Movies and books ==
Playing with the Enemy, published by Savas Beatie, is the story of Gene Moore, a young baseball prodigy drafted by the Brooklyn Dodgers. His career is interrupted by World War II, and he is assigned to a U.S. Navy baseball team playing exhibition games to entertain the troops in North Africa. After D-Day, his team is sent to Virginia, where the U-505 crew has arrived from Bermuda. The Navy baseball team secretly escorts the submarine crew to Camp Ruston. Moore and his teammates teach the submariners to play baseball. A major motion picture of the same name was under production and was scheduled for release in Fall 2009.

Savas Beatie plans to publish a book on the U-505 crew's internment at Camp Ruston, coinciding with the release of the movie Playing with the Enemy.

For a short history of Camp Ruston, see Fish Out of Water: Nazi Submariners as Prisoners of War in North Louisiana During World War II, by Wesley Harris.

== See also ==
- National Register of Historic Places listings in Lincoln Parish, Louisiana
