= SS Thomas McKean =

Liberty ship of WWII

History

United States
- Name: Thomas McKean
- Namesake: Thomas McKean
- Owner: War Shipping Administration (WSA)
- Operator: Calmar Steamship Corp.
- Ordered: as type (EC2-S-C1) hull, MCE hull 301
- Awarded: 1 May 1941
- Builder: Bethlehem-Fairfield Shipyard, Baltimore, Maryland
- Cost: $1,110,199
- Yard number: 2051
- Way number: 14
- Laid down: 5 November 1941
- Launched: 30 April 1942
- Completed: 29 May 1942
- Identification: Call sign: KEWO
- Fate: Sunk, 29 June 1942

General characteristics
- Class & type: Liberty ship; type EC2-S-C1, standard
- Tonnage: 10,865 LT DWT; 7,176 GRT
- Displacement: 3,380 long tons (3,434 t) (light); 14,245 long tons (14,474 t) (max)
- Length: 441 feet 6 inches (135 m) oa; 416 feet (127 m) pp; 427 feet (130 m) lwl
- Beam: 57 feet (17 m)
- Draft: 27 ft 9.25 in (8.4646 m)
- Installed power: 2 × Oil fired 450 °F (232 °C) boilers, operating at 220 psi (1,500 kPa); 2,500 hp (1,900 kW)
- Propulsion: 1 × triple-expansion steam engine, (manufactured by Worthington Pump & Machinery Corp, Harrison, New Jersey); 1 × screw propeller
- Speed: 11.5 knots (21.3 km/h; 13.2 mph)
- Capacity: 562,608 cubic feet (15,931 m^{3}) (grain); 499,573 cubic feet (14,146 m^{3}) (bale)
- Complement: 38–62 USMM; 21–40 USNAG
- Armament: Varied by ship; Bow-mounted 3-inch (76 mm)/50-caliber gun; Stern-mounted 4-inch (102 mm)/50-caliber gun; 2–8 × single 20-millimeter (0.79 in) Oerlikon anti-aircraft (AA) cannons and/or, 2–8 × 37-millimeter (1.46 in) M1 AA guns

SS Thomas McKean was a Liberty ship built in the United States during World War II. She was named after Founding Father Thomas McKean, an American lawyer and politician from New Castle, in New Castle County, Delaware and Philadelphia. During the American Revolution, he was a delegate to the Continental Congress, where he signed the Continental Association, United States Declaration of Independence, and Articles of Confederation. McKean served as a President of Congress. He was at various times a member of the Federalist and Democratic-Republican parties. McKean served as President of Delaware, Chief Justice of Pennsylvania, and Governor of Pennsylvania. He is also known for holding many public positions.

== Construction ==
Thomas McKean was laid down on 5 November 1941, under a Maritime Commission contract, MCE hull 301, by the Bethlehem-Fairfield Shipyard, Baltimore, Maryland; and was launched on 30 April 1942.

== History ==
She was allocated to Calmar Steamship Corp., on 29 May 1942.

=== Sinking ===
Thomas McKean had set out on her maiden voyage from Philadelphia, in June 1942, for Bandar Shapur, Iran, with 9,000 LT (9,100 t) of Lend-Lease war supplies, that included tanks, food, and 11 aircraft. At 13:55, on the afternoon of 29 June 1942, while steaming unescorted in a zigzag course at 10 kn (19 km/h; 12 mph), Thomas McKean was struck by two torpedoes fired from the German submarine U-505, at 22°00′N 60°0′W, about 350 nmi (650 km; 400 mi) northeast of Puerto Rico. One of the torpedoes struck aft of hold #5, destroying the stern 4-inch (100 mm)/50 caliber gun and killing three armed guards. The captain, Mellin Edwin Respess, ordered the crew of eight officers, 31 crewmen, 17 armed guards, and four passengers to abandon ship in the four lifeboats.

U-505 surfaced about 20 minutes later and fired 72 rounds into Thomas McKean with her 10.5 cm (4.1 in) deck gun, setting her on fire and sinking her at 15:22. U-505 then questioned the survivors and administered first aid before leaving.

The four lifeboats became separated over the next few days. Two lifeboats, with 29 survivors, made landfall at St. Thomas, Virgin Islands, on 4 July. One lifeboat made land at Antigua, 12 July, with 12 survivors. The last lifeboat, with 14 survivors and one dead, made landfall at Miches, Dominican Republic, on 14 July. The captain of Thomas McKean died 23 July 1942, during repatriation when the cargo ship SS Onondaga was sunk by U-129.

U-505 was famously captured on 4 June 1944 and is now a museum ship at the Museum of Science and Industry, in Chicago, Illinois.
