= Western Approaches Museum =

Museum in Liverpool, England

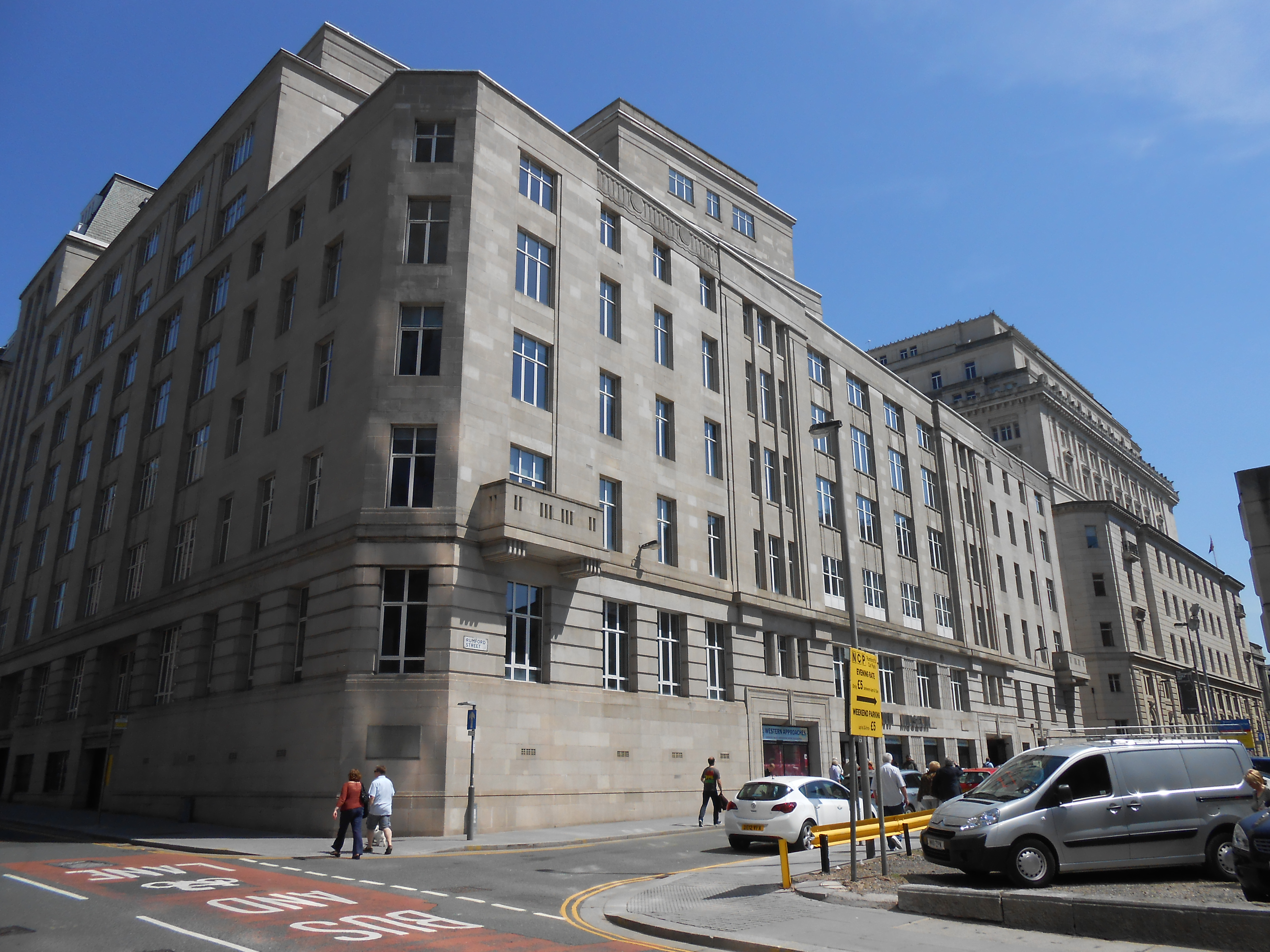
- Western Approaches Museum, Rumford Street, Liverpool
- Former name: Western Approaches; WWII Museum
- Established: 1993
- Location: Derby House, Exchange Flags, Liverpool, England, United Kingdom
- Coordinates: 53.407612°N 2.9930017°W
- Director: Dean Paton
- Public transit access: Moorfields railway station
- Parking: Rumford St, L2 8SZ
- Website: http://www.liverpoolwarmuseum.co.uk

The Western Approaches Museum in Liverpool, England, is a museum chronicling the work of Western Approaches Command around Atlantic convoys, combating the U-boat menace and the Battle of the Atlantic. Set in the restored former Second World War command centre responsible for coordinating the effort, the museum consists of re-opened rooms housing artefacts from when the command centre was in active use.

The museum includes a tour that covers the Central Operations room, cypher room, a 1940s street scene, NAAFI canteen and community classroom facility. It also contains the original Gaumont Kalee Dragon projector which Winston Churchill used to watch secret war footage.

== History ==
=== Postwar ===
Bill Davies' Walton Group restored it in the 1980s when they bought Exchange Flags. It was opened in 1993.

=== 21st century ===
Since September 2017, the museum has been run by a social enterprise group, Big Heritage. Since taking over, Big Heritage has undertaken a restoration of the site, unearthing artefacts and parts of the facility that had been closed off since the 1960s. The museum now hosts a special exhibition entitles "The Arctic Convoys - A Shared History" and an exhibition dedicated to the women of the WRNS (Women's Royal Naval Service).

On 24 October 2021 it was announced that the custodianship of the German U-boat U-534 was to be given to heritage charity Big Heritage, operators of the Western Approaches Museum in Liverpool who plan to build a new visitor facility to open in 2026.
