= German submarine U-534 =

Salvaged WW2 German U-boat on display in Birkenhead, Wirral, England

Coordinates: 53°23′42″N 3°00′34″W

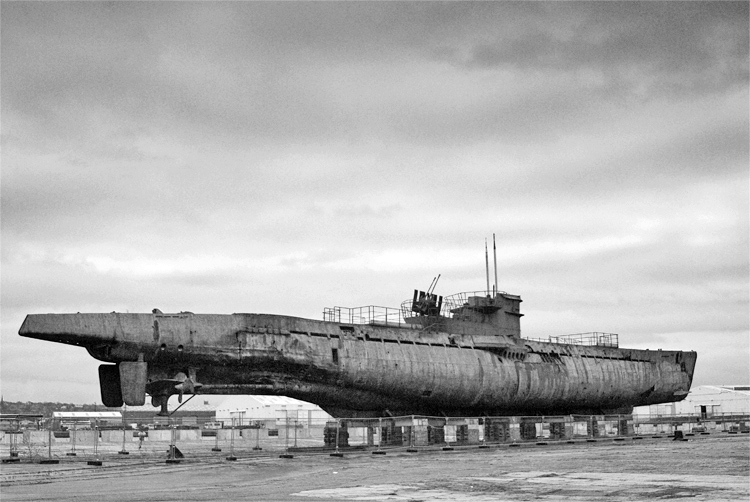
- U-534 at Birkenhead Docks in March 2007

History

Nazi Germany
- Name: U-534
- Ordered: 10 April 1941
- Builder: Deutsche Werft AG, Hamburg
- Yard number: 352
- Laid down: 20 February 1942
- Launched: 23 September 1942
- Commissioned: 23 December 1942
- Fate: Sunk by aircraft on 5 May 1945; Salvaged on 23 August 1993; Museum ship since 10 February 2009

General characteristics
- Class & type: Type IXC/40 submarine
- Displacement: 1,144 t (1,126 long tons) surfaced; 1,257 t (1,237 long tons) submerged
- Length: 76.76 m (251 ft 10 in) o/a; 58.75 m (192 ft 9 in) pressure hull
- Beam: 6.86 m (22 ft 6 in) o/a; 4.44 m (14 ft 7 in) pressure hull
- Height: 9.60 m (31 ft 6 in)
- Draught: 4.67 m (15 ft 4 in)
- Installed power: 4,400 PS (3,200 kW; 4,300 bhp) (diesels); 1,000 PS (740 kW; 990 shp) (electric)
- Propulsion: 2 shafts; 2 × MAN (Maschinenfabrik Augsburg-Nuremberg) 9-cylinder 4-stroke M9V 40/46 diesel engines with Büchi superchargers; 2 × electric motors
- Speed: 18.3 knots (33.9 km/h; 21.1 mph) surfaced; 7.3 knots (13.5 km/h; 8.4 mph) submerged
- Range: 13,850 nmi (25,650 km; 15,940 mi) at 10 knots (19 km/h; 12 mph) surfaced; 63 nmi (117 km; 72 mi) at 4 knots (7.4 km/h; 4.6 mph) submerged
- Test depth: 230 m (750 ft)
- Complement: 4 officers, 44 enlisted
- Armament: 6 × torpedo tubes (4 bow, 2 stern); 22 × 53.3 cm (21 in) torpedoes; 1 × 10.5 cm (4.1 in) SK C/32 deck gun (180 rounds); 1 × 3.7 cm (1.5 in) SK C/30 AA gun; 1 × twin 2 cm FlaK 30 AA guns

Service record
- Part of: 4th U-boat Flotilla; 23 December 1942 – 31 May 1943; 2nd U-boat Flotilla; 1 June 1943 – 31 October 1944; 33rd U-boat Flotilla; 1 November 1944 – 5 May 1945
- Identification codes: M 49 357
- Commanders: Kptlt. Herbert Nollau; 23 December 1942 – 5 May 1945
- Operations: 3 patrols: 1st patrol: 8 May – 13 August 1944; 2nd patrol: a. 25 August – 24 October 1944; b. 25 – 28 October 1944; c. 1 – 2 May 1945; 3rd patrol: 5 May 1945
- Victories: No ships sunk; Two British aircraft shot down

German submarine U-534 is a Type IXC/40 U-boat of Nazi Germany's Kriegsmarine built for service during World War II. She was built in 1942 in Hamburg-Finkenwerder by Deutsche Werft AG as yard number 352. She was launched on 23 September 1942 and commissioned on 23 December with Oberleutnant zur See Herbert Nollau in command.

U-534 is one of only four German World War II submarines in preserved condition remaining in the world, albeit cut into sections unlike the others, these being the IXC boat U-505 in Chicago's Museum of Science and Industry, the VIIC/41 boat U-995 at the Laboe Naval Memorial near Kiel and the XXI boat U-2540 in Bremerhaven.

U-534 was used mainly for training duties; during her service she sank no ships. A Royal Air Force bomber sank her on 5 May 1945 in the Kattegat 20 kilometres (11 nmi) northeast of the Danish island of Anholt. U-534 was salvaged on 23 August 1993 and was moved to Woodside Ferry, Birkenhead to form the 'U-Boat Story' museum. This attraction opened on 10 February 2009 and closed in 2020.

In October 2021, ownership of U-534 transferred to Big Heritage, operators of the nearby Western Approaches Museum.

== Design ==
German Type IXC/40 submarines were slightly larger than the original Type IXCs. U-534 had a displacement of 1,144 tonnes (1,126 long tons) when on the surface and 1,257 tonnes (1,237 long tons) while submerged. The U-boat had a total length of 76.76 m (251 ft 10 in), a pressure hull length of 58.75 m (192 ft 9 in), a beam of 6.86 m (22 ft 6 in), a height of 9.60 m (31 ft 6 in), and a draught of 4.67 m (15 ft 4 in). The submarine was powered by two MAN M 9 V 40/46 supercharged four-stroke, nine-cylinder diesel engines producing a total of 4,400 metric horsepower (3,240 kW; 4,340 shp) for use while surfaced - two Siemens-Schuckert 2 GU 345/34 double-acting electric motors producing a total of 1,000 shaft horsepower (1,010 PS; 750 kW) for use while submerged. She had two shafts and two 1.92 m (6 ft) propellers. The boat was capable of operating at depths of up to 230 metres (750 ft).

The submarine had a maximum surface speed of 18.3 knots (33.9 km/h; 21.1 mph) and a maximum submerged speed of 7.3 knots (13.5 km/h; 8.4 mph). When submerged, the boat could operate for 63 nautical miles (117 km; 72 mi) at 4 knots (7.4 km/h; 4.6 mph); when surfaced, she could travel 13,850 nautical miles (25,650 km; 15,940 mi) at 10 knots (19 km/h; 12 mph). U-534 was fitted with six 53.3 cm (21 in) torpedo tubes - (four fitted in the bow and two at the stern), 22 torpedoes, one 10.5 cm (4.13 in) SK C/32 naval gun, with 180 rounds and a 3.7 cm (1.5 in) SK C/30 as well as a 20 mm (0.79 in) C/30 anti-aircraft gun. The boat had a complement of forty-eight.

=== Armament ===
==== Torpedoes ====
U-534 carried the only known combat deployment of the electric G7es (TXI) (Zaunkönig II). The weapon, which had an effective range of 5,700 metres (6,200 yd) at a speed of 24 knots (44 km/h; 28 mph), was an improved version of the acoustic G7e torpedo. It used passive homing to find its target after a straight run of 400 metres (440 yd). Of the 16 torpedoes salvaged from the wreck in 1993 at least three were TXIs. One torpedo was later restored and put on display alongside the U-boat in Birkenhead. The TXI was created to counter the Allies' Foxer noise-maker countermeasure.

==== FLAK weaponry ====
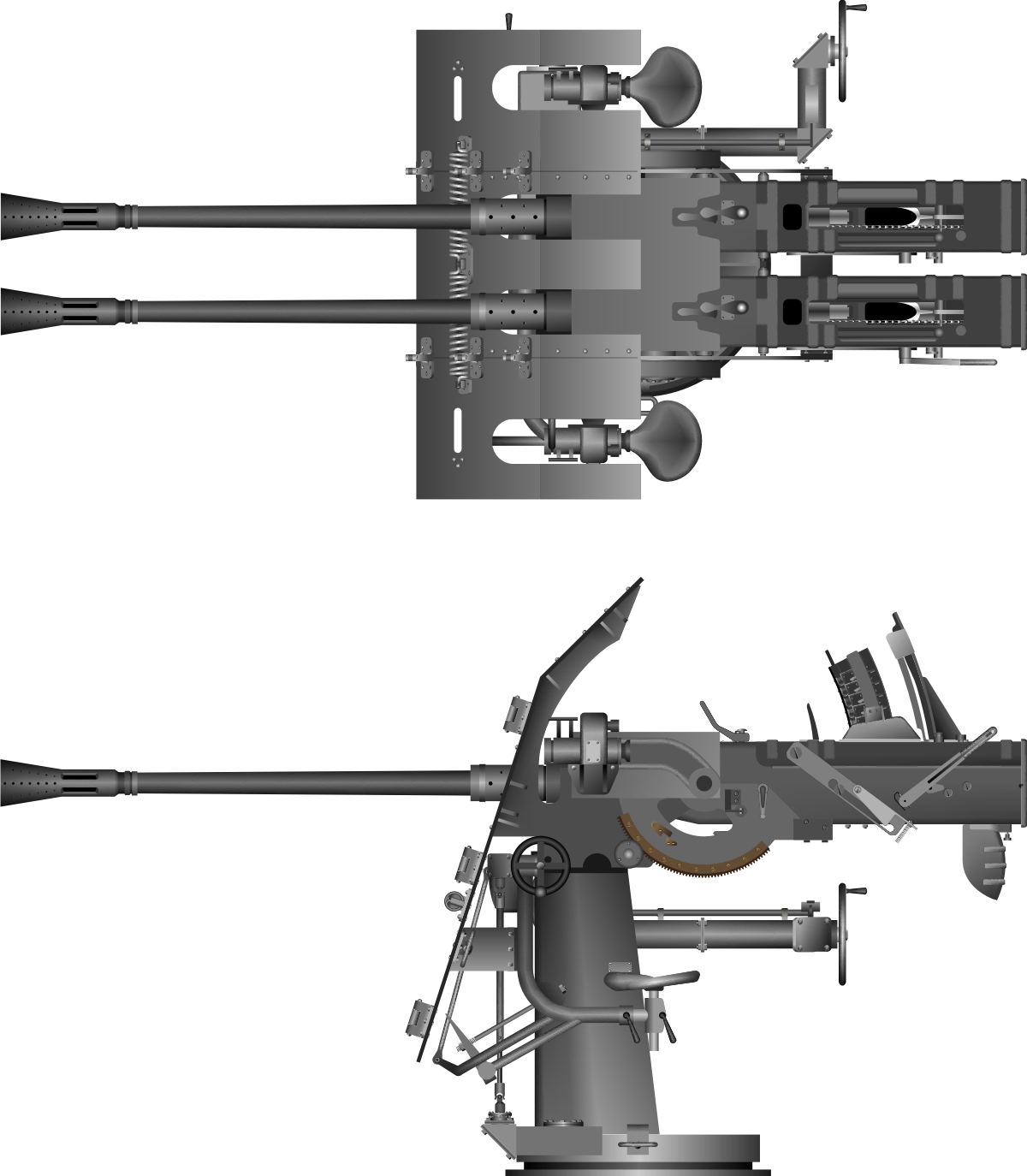
Twin 3.7 cm Flak M42U guns on the DLM 42U mount

U-534 carried the rare Twin 3.7 cm Flakzwilling M43U on the DLM42 mount. This was one of the best AA weapons of Nazi Germany's Kriegsmarine. The DLM42 mount was used mainly on the Type IX as it was too heavy for the Type VII U-boats. The 3.7 cm Flak M42U was the marine version of the 3.7 cm Flak used by the Kriegsmarine on Type VII and Type IX U-boats.

=== Anti-sonar countermeasures ===
Just above the propeller shaft on the starboard side was the exit chute of a Pillenwerfer. It could deploy an anti-sonar decoy called Bold, named after Kobold, a goblin in German folklore. This made a false target for the enemy's sonar by creating a screen of bubbles from the chemical reaction of calcium hydride with sea water.

== Service history ==
After commissioning, U-534 was assigned to the 4th U-boat Flotilla, based in Stettin, for training purposes and weapons testing until February 1943. She was then reconfigured (main gun removed, flak gun added) and in June 1943 transferred to the 2nd flotilla "Saltzwedel".

=== May 1944 ===
U-534 headed for Bergen and arrived on 6 May 1944. Two days later she left on operational duty, along with U-853 and U-857, for weather reporting duty off the coast of Greenland.

Her first war patrol was plagued by an oil leak and bad weather in the North Atlantic.

=== August 1944 ===
On 11 August she was attacked by an aircraft but escaped undamaged. Two days later, she, along with U-857 and U-437, was attacked by two Halifax bombers. The aircraft, E of No. 58 Squadron RAF and K of No. 502 Squadron RAF suffered heavy flak damage. U-534 arrived safely in Bordeaux, where she was fitted with a Schnorchel.

On the second patrol, from 25 August 1944 to 24 October, the boat had to escape the Allied blockade of Lorient in France and get back to a friendly port. On 25 August U-534 left Bordeaux and the new Schnorchel was used for the first time. Exhaust gases leaked into the boat and several crew members collapsed. Surfacing for air, she was spotted and attacked by a Wellington bomber, B of No. 172 Squadron RAF, which her gunners shot down on 27 August. On 28 October, she arrived in Kiel where she was transferred to the 33rd U-boat Flotilla and underwent an extensive refit in Stettin, which put her out of action until 1 May 1945.

=== May 1945 ===
In the early hours of 5 May 1945, a partial surrender ordered by Admiral Dönitz of German forces in Denmark, Germany and other areas came into effect. U-534 was informed by the harbour master at Øresund Elsinore that the ceasefire was in effect north of the 56th parallel.

== Incidents leading to sinking ==
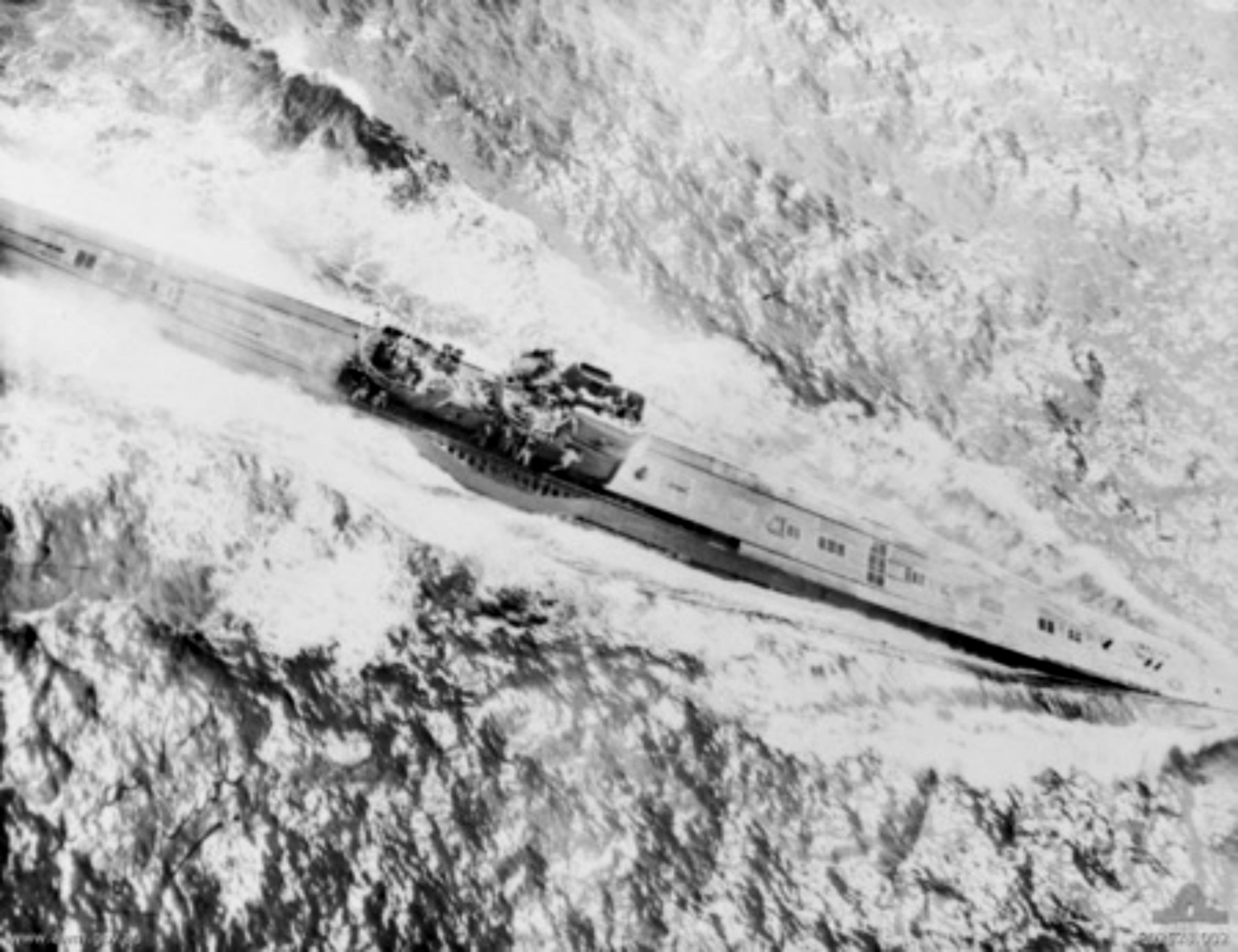
U-534 under attack by an RAF Liberator, from 86 Squadron

On 5 May 1945, U-534 was 2 nautical miles (3.7 km) north of the 56th parallel, and Nollau decided to form a convoy with two Type XXI U-boats, U-3523 and U-3503, and continue sailing north on the surface of the Kattegat sea in an area too shallow for crash diving, when two British RAF Liberator aircraft attacked, G/86 from Tain and E/547 'Edward' from Leuchars). The crew managed to shoot E/547 down, and nine depth charges from the bombing runs missed, but then the boat received a direct hit by a depth charge from G/86. U-534 began to take on water as a result of the damage to her aft section by the engine rooms, and sank northeast of Anholt. E/547 crashed 3 nautical miles (5.6 km) away, and all on board the plane were lost. The Captain of G/86 'G for George', Warrant Officer J.D Nichol, was awarded the DFC as a result of this action.

U-534 had aboard a crew of 52; all escaped, and 49 survived to be rescued. Five were trapped in the torpedo room as she began to sink, but they managed to escape through the torpedo loading hatch once the boat had settled on the sea bed. They planned their escape the way that they had been trained, exiting through the forward torpedo loading hatch once the U-boat had settled on the seabed and swimming to the surface from a depth of 67 metres (220 ft). One of them, 17-year-old radio operator, Josef Neudorfer, failed to exhale as he was surfacing and died from damage to his lungs. Two others (including the submarine's radio operator of Argentine origin) died of exposure while in the water.

== Salvage ==
U-534 lay on the sea bed for nearly 41 years, until she was discovered at a depth of 67 metres in 1986 by a Danish wreck hunter, Aage Jensen. Shortly afterwards, the wreck hunters' group contacted Danish media millionaire Karsten Ree, who sponsored raising the submarine, as rumours of Nazi gold caused intense media coverage. However, the boat turned out to contain nothing unusual.

U-534 was raised to the surface on 23 August 1993 by the Dutch salvage company Smit Tak.

U-534 had phonograph records which were able to be played after conservation and contained music by Johann Sebastian Bach, Robert Schumann, Johann Strauss II, and singers Zarah Leander and Gerhard Hüsch.

== Museum ship ==
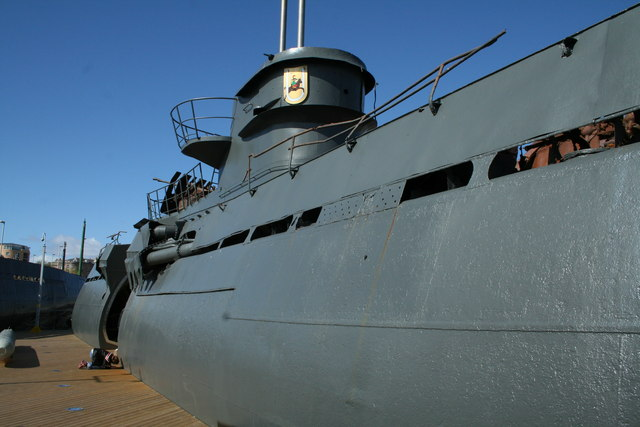
U-534 on display

Transported to Birkenhead, England, in 1996, the vessel formed part of the Warship Preservation Trust's collection at Birkenhead Docks until the museum closed on 5 February 2006. On 27 June 2007, the Merseytravel transit authority announced that it had acquired the submarine to display at the Woodside Ferry Terminal.

For technical reasons and to facilitate economical transportation to its new site, the vessel was cut into five sections, two of which were subsequently re-joined. It is now displayed in sectioned form to allow visitors better visibility without entering the U-boat. Merseytravel said that preserving the hull intact would have created prohibitive transport costs. Engineers began a month-long operation to divide U-534, using a diamond wire cutter, on 6 February 2008. On 10 March 2008, the sections, each weighing as much as 240 tonnes, were transported over several days by floating crane.

The U-boat Story exhibition opened on 10 February 2009 and closed in 2020.

On 24 October 2021 it was announced that the custodianship of U-534 was to be given to heritage charity Big Heritage, operators of the Western Approaches Museum in Liverpool who plan to build a new visitor facility to open in 2026.

== Gallery ==
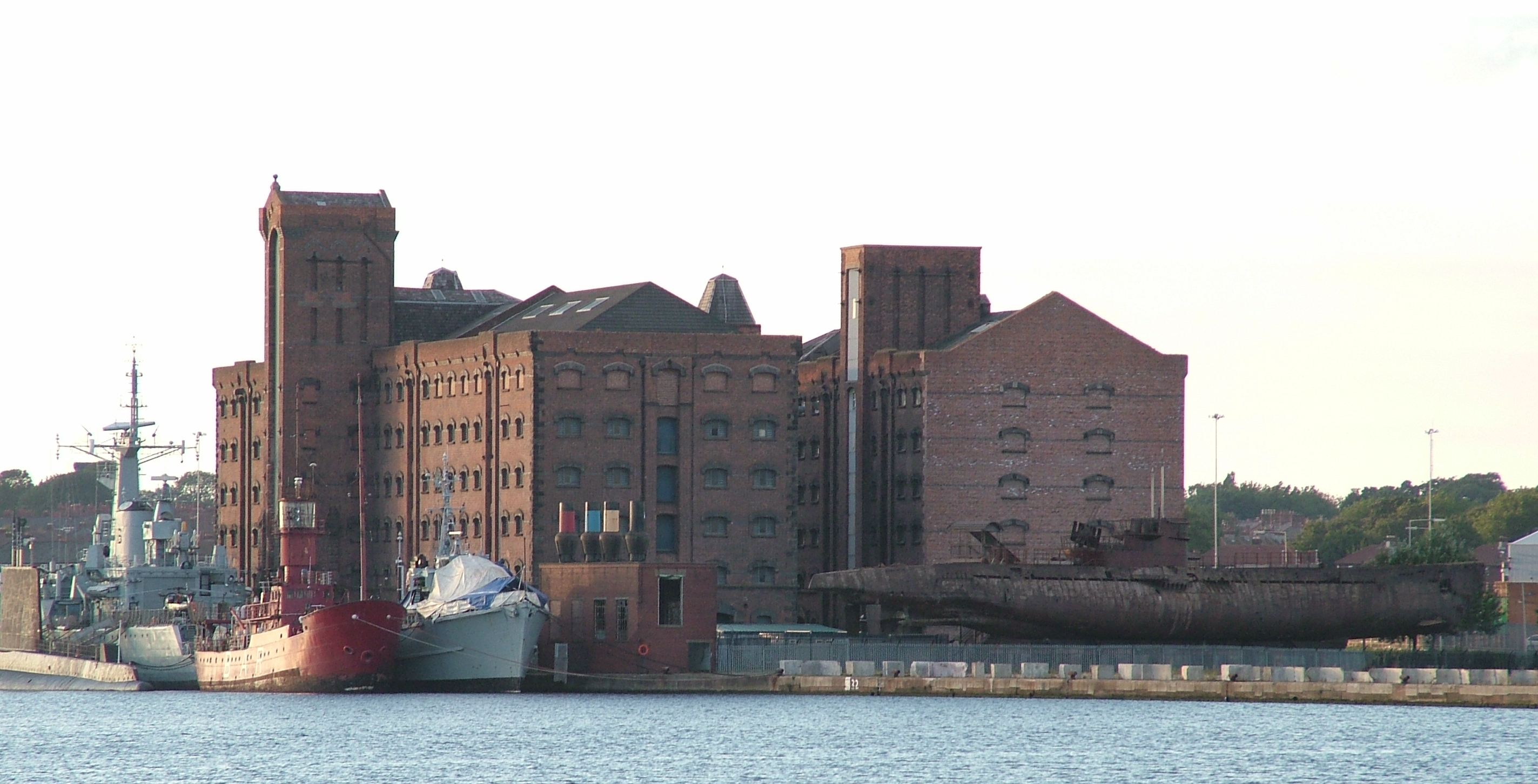
U-534 at the Historic Warships Museum, Birkenhead, Merseyside

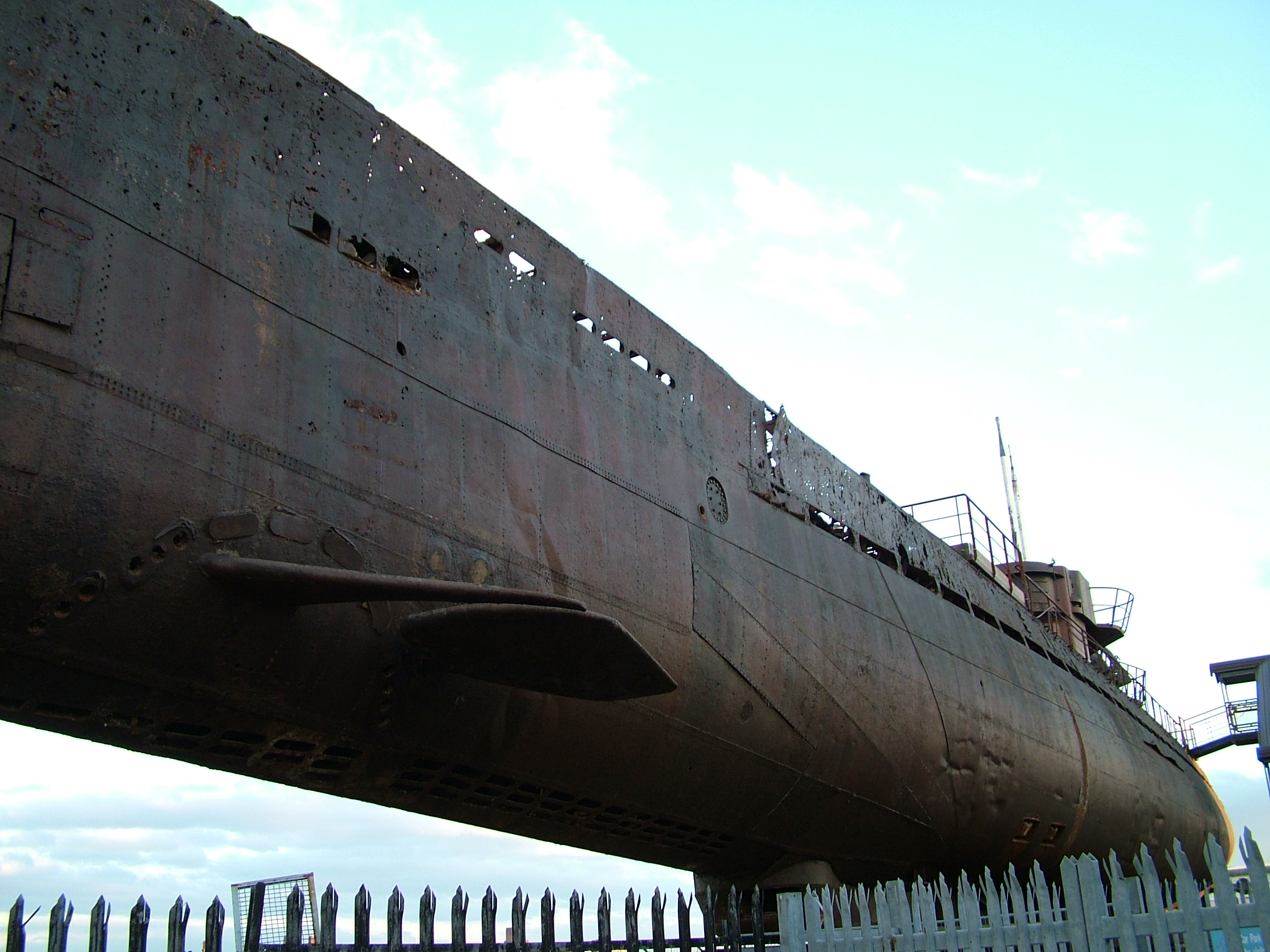
Part of the hull and conning tower of U-534

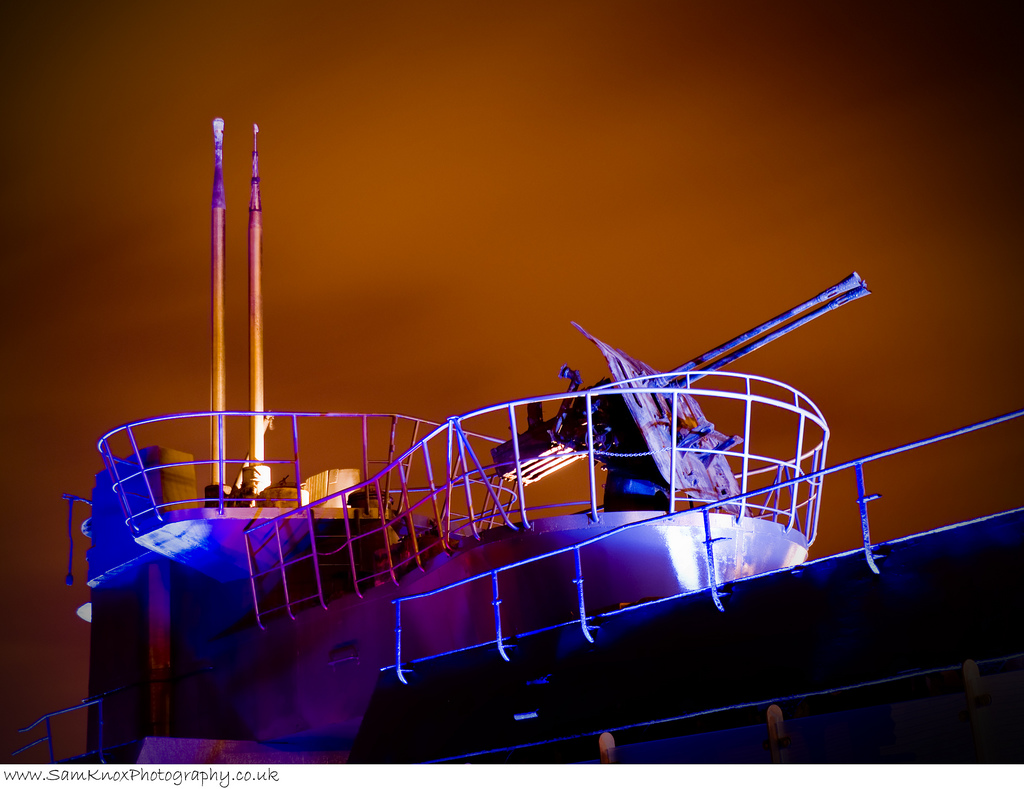
U-534 in situ at the U-534 visitors centre at Woodside

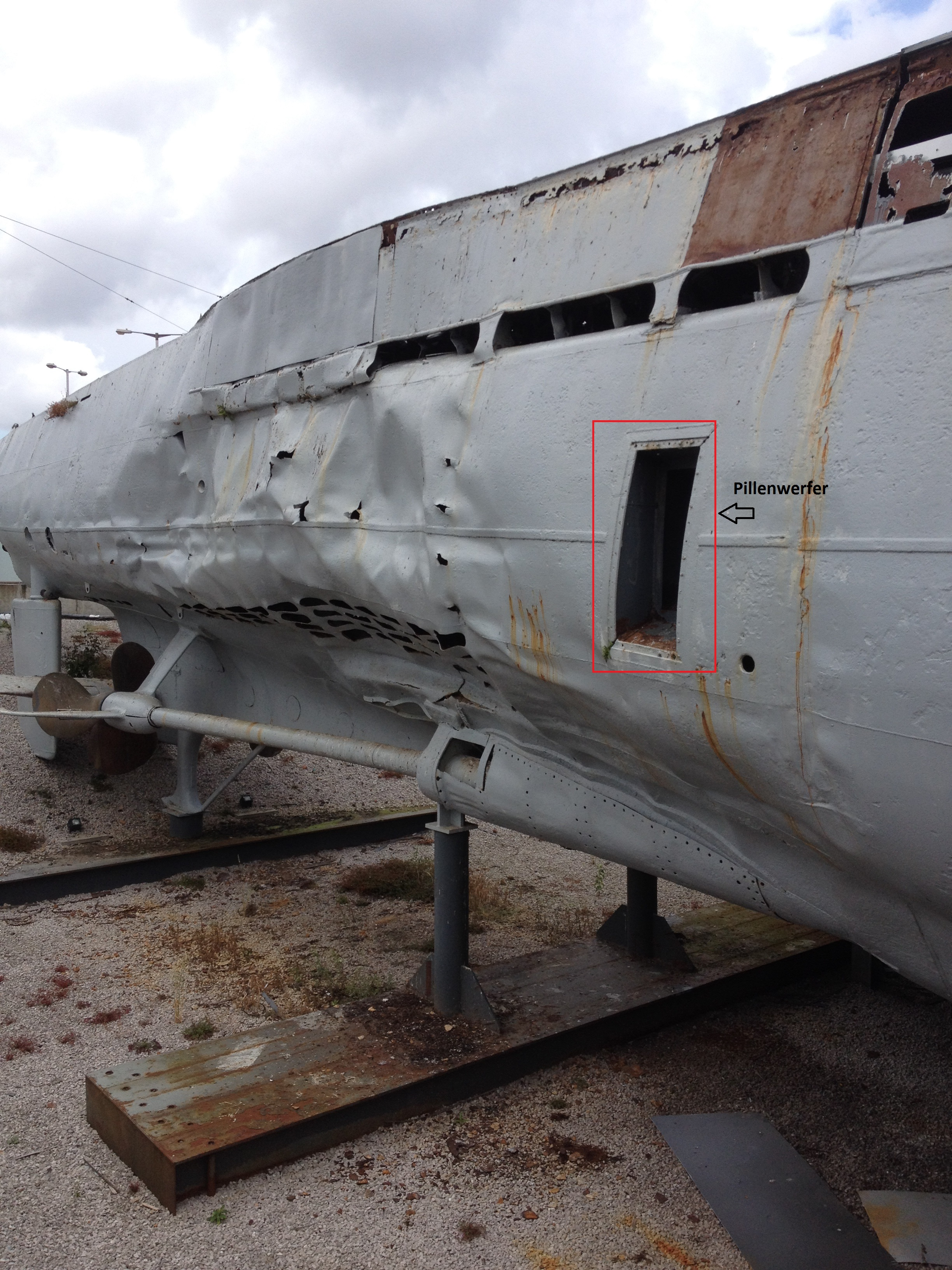
Aft starboard side showing depth charge damage and Pillenwerfer chute (rectangular hole)

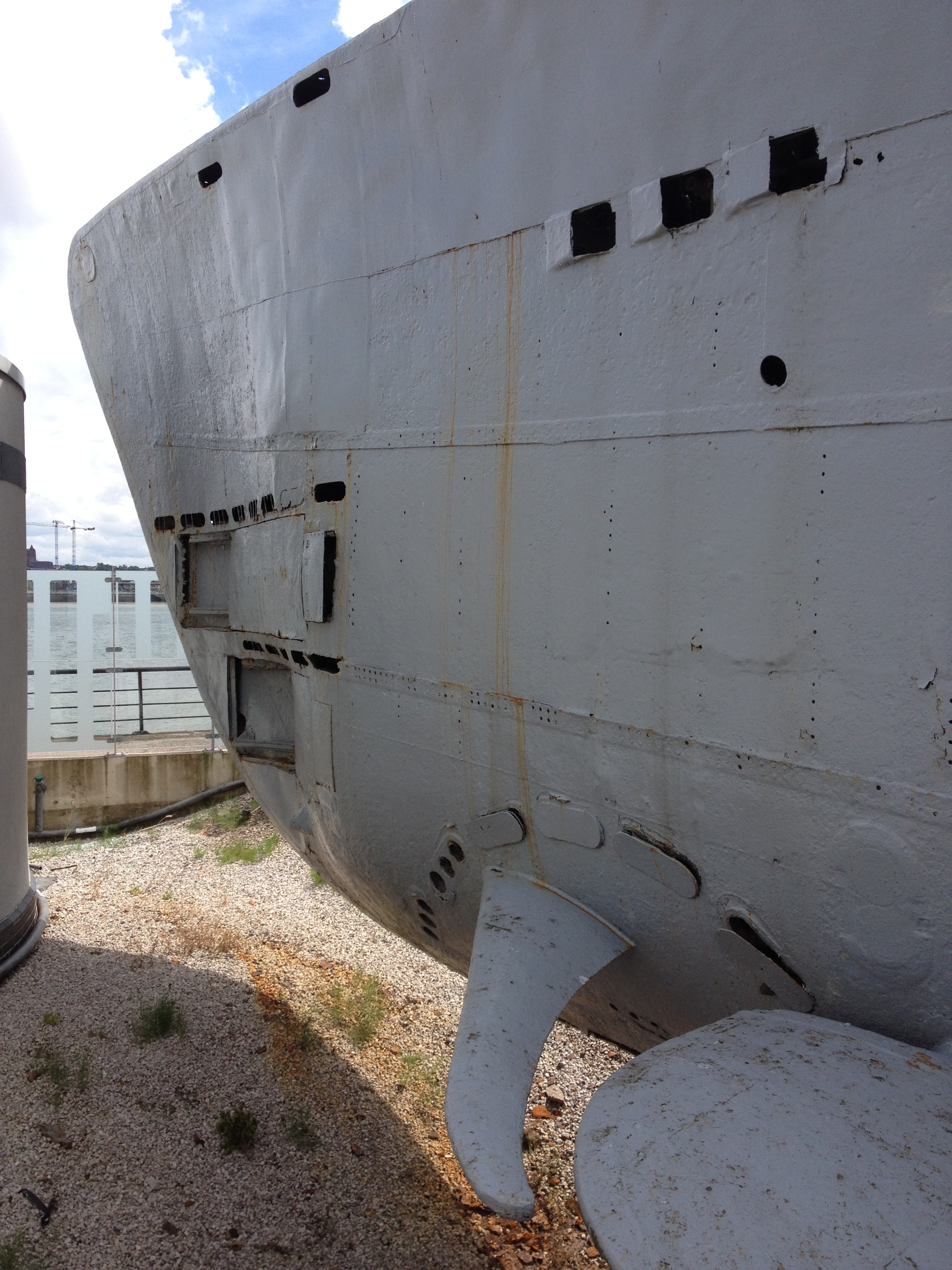
Forward port side showing hydroplanes & torpedo tubes

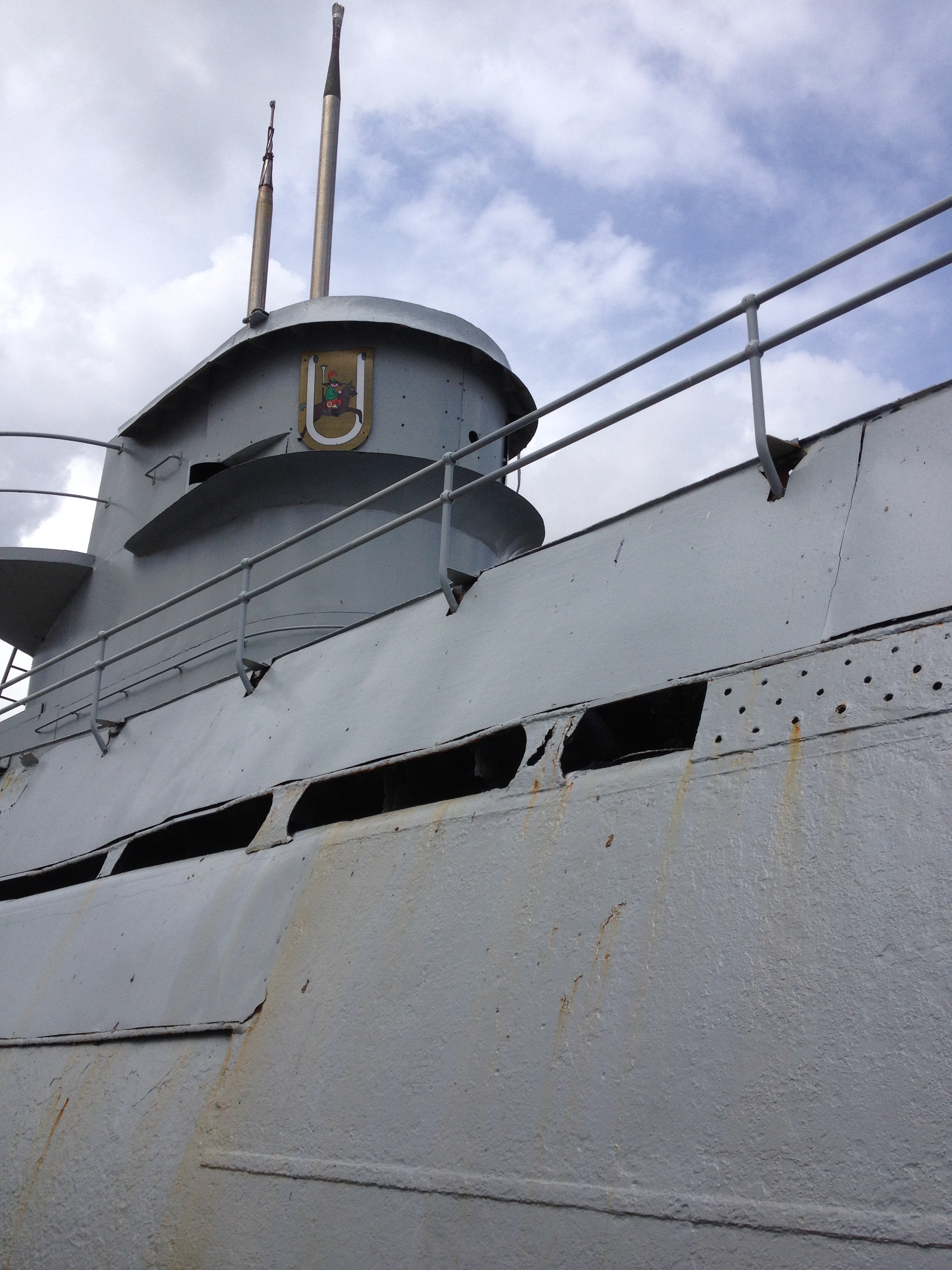
U-534 conning tower

== See also ==
=== Surviving U-boats ===
- SM U-1
- U-505
- U-995
- Wilhelm Bauer (originally U-2540)

=== Other ===
- U-778

== Bibliography ==
- Busch, Rainer; Röll, Hans-Joachim (1999). German U-boat commanders of World War II : a biographical dictionary. Translated by Brooks, Geoffrey. London, Annapolis, Md: Greenhill Books, Naval Institute Press. ISBN 1-55750-186-6.
- Busch, Rainer; Röll, Hans-Joachim (1999). Deutsche U-Boot-Verluste von September 1939 bis Mai 1945 [German U-boat losses from September 1939 to May 1945]. Der U-Boot-Krieg (in German). Vol. IV. Hamburg, Berlin, Bonn: Mittler. ISBN 3-8132-0514-2.
- Gröner, Erich; Jung, Dieter; Maass, Martin (1991). U-boats and Mine Warfare Vessels. German Warships 1815–1945. Vol. 2. Translated by Thomas, Keith; Magowan, Rachel. London: Conway Maritime Press. ISBN 0-85177-593-4.
