= Peter Zschech =

German submariner who died by suicide

- Born: 1 October 1918
- Died: 24 October 1943 (aged 25); North Atlantic
- Military career
- Branch: Kriegsmarine
- Service years: 1936–1943
- Rank: Kapitänleutnant
- Commands: U-505
- Awards: Iron Cross, 1st class

Peter Zschech (1 October 1918 – 24 October 1943) was the second commander of the German submarine U-505. He earned notoriety as the first commanding officer to commit suicide while in active command of a naval vessel, as well as the only submariner to ever do so while underwater.

== History with U-505 ==
U-505's first and very successful commander was Kapitänleutnant Axel Loewe, who was relieved in September 1942. Loewe was replaced by Zschech, a veteran U-boat officer, who served for a year as watch officer in U-124. Zschech was described as a "hard" commander, ambitious in his first command, indifferent to the morale of his men, and bad-tempered.

On 11 November 1942, a month into her first war patrol under Zschech, U-505 was heavily damaged by air attack in the Caribbean Sea. The direct impact of a 250-lb bomb from a Lockheed Hudson on the foredeck tore the deck gun from the boat and severely breached the hull. Zschech ordered his men to abandon ship but his officers refused and managed to keep her afloat after a marathon two-week effort. She eventually limped back to Lorient on 12 December, earning the vessel the mixed honor of being the most heavily damaged U-boat to successfully return to port during the war.

Repairs took six months. When Zschech again attempted to take U-505 to sea, repeated mechanical failures forced him to turn back for repairs after only a few days. This happened six consecutive times, usually due to sabotage by French dockyard workers in the Resistance, and caused U-505 to become the butt of numerous jokes for her combat ineffectiveness; while some U-boats were racking up impressive tonnage totals (and others were being sunk with all hands), U-505 had not even succeeded in leaving the Bay of Biscay in almost a year. The main joke about Zschech was, "while many other U-boats were being sunk with all hands, there is a captain who will always return home, Zschech", due to the sabotages mentioned, such as defective welds.

== Suicide while in command ==
On 10 October 1943, U-505 finally managed to leave successfully on patrol after six failed attempts. After only 14 days, she drew the attention of a pair of Allied destroyers while surfaced off the Azores and came under concentrated depth charge attack, a procedure all too common for U-boat crews by this point in the war. While riding out the depth charging, Zschech apparently suffered a severe mental breakdown and committed suicide by shooting himself in the head with a Walther PPK pistol in his control room, in full view of his shocked crew. His second-in-command, Oberleutnant zur See Paul Meyer, swiftly took command, rode out the remainder of the attack per standard procedure and returned the boat to port with light damage. However, he was not commended for his quick restoration of military discipline, but only "absolved of all blame" by the Kriegsmarine, who seemed to view U-505's troubles as proof of a generalized lack of discipline by her command crew, further harming whatever morale remained in the command staff of U-505.

Zschech's suicide devastated the morale of U-505's crew. However, Grossadmiral Karl Dönitz did not dissolve and disperse the crew as many officers recommended, fearing the effect on fleet morale if the story spread to other U-boats. It is generally accepted by historians that the terrible morale instilled in U-505's crew by the combined influence of these events led heavily to her being the only U-boat to be captured intact on the surface (instead of being scuttled as was standard procedure) when U-505 was attacked southwest of the Canary Islands on her next patrol; the crew reportedly panicked almost at once, with the new captain surfacing and abandoning ship before she was unseaworthy or even significantly damaged, leading to U-505's capture by the Allies, along with an intact Enigma machine, the month's Kriegsmarine codebook, and a variety of other secret documents. Perhaps most damaging of all, the Allies recovered U-505's G7es acoustic homing torpedoes, which were extensively reverse engineered to improve the Allied Foxer decoy system.

An alternate account is provided by Hans Goebeler, a former crewman of U-505. In his memoir Steel Boat, Iron Hearts: A U-boat Crewman's Life Aboard U-505 he states that the morale aboard U-505 was always high and that if anything, Zschech's suicide raised morale because few people liked him, and most loathed him. His book also recounts the events of the capture of U-505 describing how the submarine's rudder was jammed, and the auxiliary rudder control could not be reached because the rear compartment was flooded due to a breach from the depth charge attack. In addition, contrary to a "panicked" crew, he speaks only of the proficient and professional operation of the boat while it was under attack.

Due to U-505's intact state the submarine was later preserved as a museum ship after being stripped of all intelligence value. She currently resides as an indoor exhibit at the Museum of Science and Industry in Chicago, Illinois.

== Bibliography ==
- Busch, Rainer; Röll, Hans-Joachim (1999b). German U-boat commanders of World War II : a biographical dictionary. Translated by Brooks, Geoffrey. London, Annapolis, Md: Greenhill Books, Naval Institute Press. ISBN 1-55750-186-6.
- Gallery, Daniel. U-505.
