= German submarine U-505 =

German World War II submarine

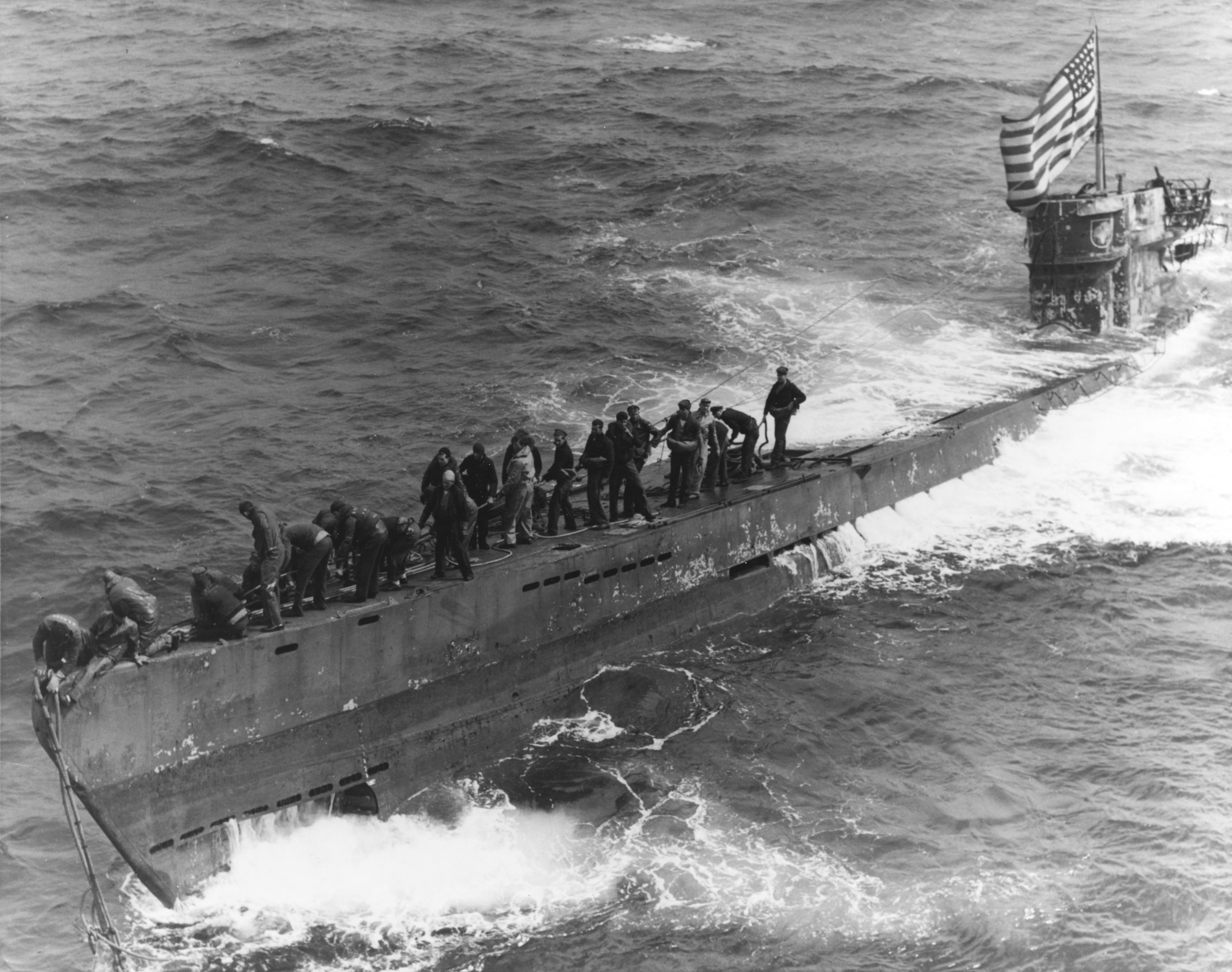
- U-505 shortly after being captured, pictured from the USS Pillsbury in preparation for towing

History

Nazi Germany
- Name: U-505
- Ordered: 25 September 1939
- Builder: Deutsche Werft AG, Hamburg-Finkenwerder
- Yard number: 295
- Laid down: 12 June 1940
- Launched: 24 May 1941
- Commissioned: 26 August 1941
- Fate: Captured by US Navy on 4 June 1944
- Status: Preserved as a museum ship

General characteristics
- Type: Type IXC submarine
- Displacement: 1,120 t (1,100 long tons) surfaced; 1,232 t (1,213 long tons) submerged
- Length: 76.76 m (251 ft 10 in) o/a; 58.75 m (192 ft 9 in) pressure hull
- Beam: 6.76 m (22 ft 2 in) o/a; 4.40 m (14 ft 5 in) pressure hull
- Height: 9.60 m (31 ft 6 in)
- Draught: 4.70 m (15 ft 5 in)
- Installed power: 4,400 PS (3,200 kW; 4,300 bhp) (diesels); 1,000 PS (740 kW; 990 shp) (electric)
- Propulsion: 2 shafts; 2 × diesel engines; 2 × electric motors
- Speed: 18.2 knots (33.7 km/h; 20.9 mph) surfaced; 7.3 knots (13.5 km/h; 8.4 mph) submerged
- Range: 13,450 nmi (24,910 km; 15,480 mi) at 10 knots (19 km/h; 12 mph) surfaced; 64 nmi (119 km; 74 mi) at 4 knots (7.4 km/h; 4.6 mph) submerged
- Test depth: 230 m (750 ft)
- Complement: 48 to 56
- Armament: 6 × torpedo tubes (4 bow, 2 stern); 22 × 53.3 cm (21 in) torpedoes; 1 × 10.5 cm (4.1 in) SK C/32 deck gun (180 rounds); 1 × 3.7 cm (1.5 in) SK C/30 AA gun; 1 × twin 2 cm FlaK 30 AA guns

Service record
- Identification codes: M 46 074
- Commanders: K.Kapt. Axel-Olaf Loewe 26 August 1941 – 5 September 1942; Kptlt. Peter Zschech 6 September 1942 – 24 October 1943; Oblt.z.S. Paul Meyer (acting) 24 October – 7 November 1943; Oblt.z.S. Harald Lange 8 November 1943 – 4 June 1944
- Operations: 12 patrols: 1st patrol: 87 January – 3 February 1942; 2nd patrol: 11 February – 7 May 1942; 3rd patrol: 7 June – 25 August 1942; 4th patrol: 4 October – 12 December 1942; 5th patrol: 1 – 13 July 1943; 6th patrol: 1 – 2 August 1943; 7th patrol: 14 – 15 August 1943; 8th patrol: 21 – 22 August 1943; 9th patrol: 18 – 30 September 1943; 10th patrol: 9 October – 7 November 1943; 11th patrol: 25 December 1943 – 2 January 1944; 12th patrol: 16 March – 4 June 1944
- Victories: 8 merchant ships sunk(45,005 GRT)
- U-505 (IXC U-boat)
- U.S. National Register of Historic Places
- U.S. National Historic Landmark
- Location within Chicago metropolitan area
- Coordinates: 41°47′30″N 87°34′53″W
- Built: 1941
- Architects: Deutsche Werft AG, Hamburg, Germany
- NRHP reference No.: 89001231

Significant dates
- Added to NRHP: 1989
- Designated NHL: 1989

U-505, briefly known as the USS Nemo, is a German Type IXC submarine (Unterseeboot) built for Germany's Kriegsmarine during World War II. She was captured by the United States Navy on 4 June 1944 and survives as a museum ship in Chicago.

In her career, she had the distinction of being the "most heavily damaged U-boat to successfully return to port" in World War II, suffering six botched patrols, and becoming the only submarine in which a commanding officer killed himself in combat conditions. On 4 June 1944, she was captured by United States Navy (USN) Task Group 22.3 (TG 22.3), one of six U-boats that were captured at sea by Allied forces during the war. All but one of U-505's crew were rescued by TG 22.3. The submarine was towed to Bermuda in secret, and her crew was interned in an American prisoner-of-war camp, where they were kept in isolation. The USN classified the capture as top secret and went to great lengths to prevent the Germans from discovering it.

In 1954, U-505 was donated to the Museum of Science and Industry in Chicago, Illinois. She is now one of four German World War II U-boats that survive as museum ships, and one of just two Type IXCs still in existence, along with U-534.

== Design ==
German Type IXC submarines were slightly larger than the original Type IXBs. U-505 had a displacement of 1,120 tonnes (1,100 long tons) when at the surface and 1,232 tonnes (1,213 long tons) while submerged. The U-boat had a total length of 76.76 m (251 ft 10 in), a pressure hull length of 58.75 m (192 ft 9 in), a beam of 6.76 m (22 ft 2 in), a height of 9.60 m (31 ft 6 in), and a draft of 4.70 m (15 ft 5 in). The submarine was powered by two MAN M 9 V 40/46 supercharged, four-stroke, nine-cylinder, diesel engines producing a total of 4,400 PS (3,240 kW; 4,340 shp) for use while surfaced, and two Siemens-Schuckert 2 GU 345/34 double-acting electric motors producing a total of 1,010 PS (750 kW; 1,000 shp) for use while submerged. She had two shafts and two 1.92 m (6 ft) propellers. The boat was capable of operating at depths down to 230 m (750 ft).

The submarine had a maximum surface speed of 18.3 knots (33.9 km/h; 21.1 mph) and a maximum submerged speed of 7.3 kn (13.5 km/h; 8.4 mph). When submerged, the boat could operate for 63 nautical miles (117 km; 72 mi) at 4 kn (7.4 km/h; 4.6 mph); when surfaced, she could travel 13,450 nmi (24,910 km; 15,480 mi) at 10 kn (19 km/h; 12 mph). U-505 was fitted with six 53.3 cm (21 in) torpedo tubes (four fitted at the bow and two at the stern), 22 torpedoes, one 10.5 cm (4.13 in) SK C/32 naval gun, 180 rounds, and a 3.7 cm (1.5 in) SK C/30, as well as a 20 mm (0.79 in) C/30 antiaircraft gun. The boat had a complement of 48 crew.

== Service history ==
U-505's keel was laid down on 12 June 1940 by Deutsche Werft in Hamburg, Germany, as yard number 295. She was launched on 24 May 1941 and commissioned on 26 August with Kapitänleutnant Axel-Olaf Loewe in command. On 6 September 1942, Loewe was relieved by Kptlt. Peter Zschech. On 24 October 1943, Oberleutnant zur See Paul Meyer took command for about two weeks until he was relieved on 8 November by Oblt.z.S. Harald Lange, who commanded the boat until her capture on 4 June 1944.

She conducted 12 patrols, sinking eight ships totaling 45,005 GRT. Three of these were American, two British, one Norwegian, one Dutch, and one Colombian.

=== First patrol ===
U-505 was assigned as an operational boat to the 2nd U-boat Flotilla on 1 February 1942, following training exercises with the 4th U-boat Flotilla from 26 August 1941 to 31 January 1942. She began her first patrol from Kiel on 19 January, while still formally undergoing training. For 16 days, she circumnavigated the British Isles and docked at Lorient in occupied France on 3 February. She engaged no enemy vessels and was not attacked.

=== Second patrol ===
U-505 left Lorient on 11 February 1942 on her second patrol. In 86 days, she traveled to the west coast of Africa, where she sank her first vessels. In less than one month, U-505 sank four ships: British Benmohr, Norwegian Sydhav, American West Irmo, and Dutch Alphacca for a total of 25,041 GRT. On 18 April, U-505 was attacked by an Allied aircraft in the mid-Atlantic, but suffered little damage.

=== Third patrol ===
U-505 began her third patrol on 7 June 1942, after leaving her home port of Lorient. She sank the American ships Sea Thrush and Thomas McKean and the Colombian Urious in the Caribbean Sea. Urious was a sailing ship belonging to a Colombian diplomat, and her sinking was one of a long series of incidents that gave Colombia political grounds to declare war on Germany a year later. U-505 then returned to Lorient on 25 August after 80 days on patrol without being attacked.

=== Fourth patrol ===
U-505's fourth patrol sent her to the northern coast of South America. She left Lorient on 4 October, 1942, and sank the British vessel Ocean Justice off the coast of Venezuela on 7 November. On 10 November near Trinidad, U-505 was surprised on the surface by a Lockheed Hudson maritime patrol aircraft from No. 53 Squadron, Royal Air Force, which made a low-level attack, landing a 250 lb (110 kg) bomb directly on the deck from just above water level. The explosion killed one watch officer and wounded another in the conning tower. It also tore the antiaircraft gun off its mounting and severely damaged the boat's pressure hull. The aircraft was hit by fragmentation from the bomb's explosion and crashed into the ocean near U-505, killing the pilot Flight Sergeant Ronald Sillcock (Royal Australian Air Force (RAAF) and his entire crew. With the pumps inoperative and water flooding the engine room in several places, Kptlt. Zschech ordered the crew to abandon ship, but the technical staff (led by Chief Petty Officer Otto Fricke) insisted on trying to save her. The vessel was made water-tight after almost two weeks of repair work. After sending the wounded watch officer to the supply submarine ("milk cow") U-462, U-505 limped back to Lorient on reduced power.

=== Aborted patrols ===
After six months in Lorient for repairs, U-505 started her fifth patrol. She left Lorient on 1 July 1943 and returned after 13 days, after an attack by three British destroyers that had stalked her for over 30 hours. While U-505 was not badly damaged in this encounter, she had to return to France for repairs. U-505's next four patrols were all aborted after only a few days at sea, due to equipment failure and sabotage by French dockworkers working for the Resistance. Faults found included sabotaged electrical and radar equipment, a hole deliberately drilled in a diesel fuel tank, and faulty welds on parts repaired by French workers. This happened so many times that she became the butt of jokes throughout the base at Lorient. Upon returning from one botched patrol, her crew found a sign painted in the docking area reading: "U-505's Hunting Ground". At a time when many U-boats were being sunk, U-505's commander, Kptlt. Zschech, overheard another U-boat commander joke, "There is one commander who will always come back ... Zschech."

=== Tenth patrol and Zschech's suicide ===
After 10 months in Lorient, U-505 departed for her 10th Atlantic patrol, seeking to break her run of bad morale. British destroyers spotted her east of the Azores on 24 October 1943, not long after crossing the Bay of Biscay, and she was forced to submerge and endure a severe depth-charge attack. Zschech died by suicide in the submarine's control room, shooting himself in the head in front of his crew. First-watch officer Paul Meyer took command and returned the boat to port with minimal damage. Meyer was "absolved from all blame" by the Kriegsmarine for the incident. Zschech is recorded as the only known submariner during the war to die by suicide underwater in response to the stress of a prolonged depth charging.

=== Eleventh patrol ===
The boat was placed under the command of Oblt.z.S. Harald Lange. U-505's 11th patrol began on Christmas Day 1943. She again returned early to Lorient on 2 January 1944, after she rescued 33 crew members from the German torpedo boat 'T25', sunk on 28 December by British cruisers in the Bay of Biscay.

U-505 took part in Wolfpack Hela from 28 December 1943 until 1 January 1944.

== Twelfth patrol and capture ==
=== Antisubmarine task force ===
The Allies had learned from decrypted German messages that U-boats were operating near Cape Verde, West Africa, but not their exact locations. The USN dispatched Task Group 22.3 to the area, a hunter-killer group commanded by Captain Daniel V. Gallery. TG 22.3 consisted of the escort aircraft carrier Guadalcanal and the destroyer escorts Pillsbury, Pope, Flaherty, Chatelain, and Jenks under Commander Frederick S. Hall. The group sailed from Norfolk, Virginia, on 15 May 1944 and began searching for U-boats in the area in late May, using high-frequency direction-finding fixes ("huff-duff") and air and surface reconnaissance.

=== Detection and attack ===
At 11:09 on 4 June 1944, TG 22.3 made sonar (ASDIC) contact with U-505 at 21°30′N 19°20′W, about 150 nmi (280 km; 170 mi) off the coast of Río de Oro (Spanish Sahara) only 800 yards (700 m) from Chatelain's starboard bow. The escorts immediately moved towards the contact, while Guadalcanal moved away at top speed and launched a Grumman F4F Wildcat fighter to join another Wildcat and a Grumman TBM Avenger torpedo bomber, which were already airborne.

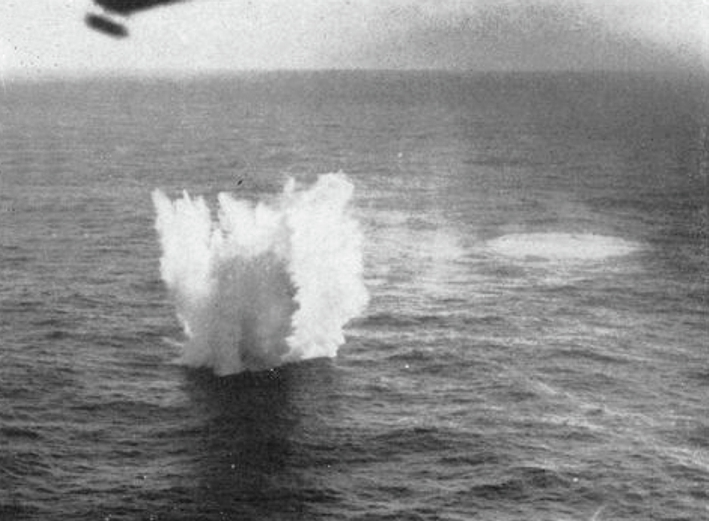
Depth charges explode near the German submarine U-505 in the Atlantic Ocean on 4 June 1944

Chatelain was so close to U-505 that depth charges would not sink fast enough to intercept the U-boat, so she fired Hedgehog antisubmarine mortars before passing the submarine and turning to make a follow-up attack with depth charges. One of the aircraft sighted U-505 and fired into the water to mark the position, while Chatelain dropped depth charges. Immediately after the detonation of the charges, a large oil slick spread on the water and the fighter pilot radioed: "You struck oil! Sub is surfacing!" Less than 7 minutes after Chatelain's first attack began, the badly damaged submarine surfaced less than 600 m (700 yd) away. Chatelain immediately opened fire on her with all available weapons, joined by other ships of the task force and the two Wildcats.

Lange believed U-505 to be seriously damaged and ordered his crew to abandon ship. They obeyed the order promptly, but they did not successfully scuttle the boat; they opened some valves, but left the engines running. The rudder had been damaged by depth charges, so the submarine circled clockwise at roughly 7 kn (13 km/h; 8 mph). The commanding officer of Chatelain saw the submarine turning toward his ship and thought that she was about to attack, so he ordered a single torpedo to be fired at her; the torpedo missed, passing ahead of the abandoned U-505.

=== Salvage operations ===
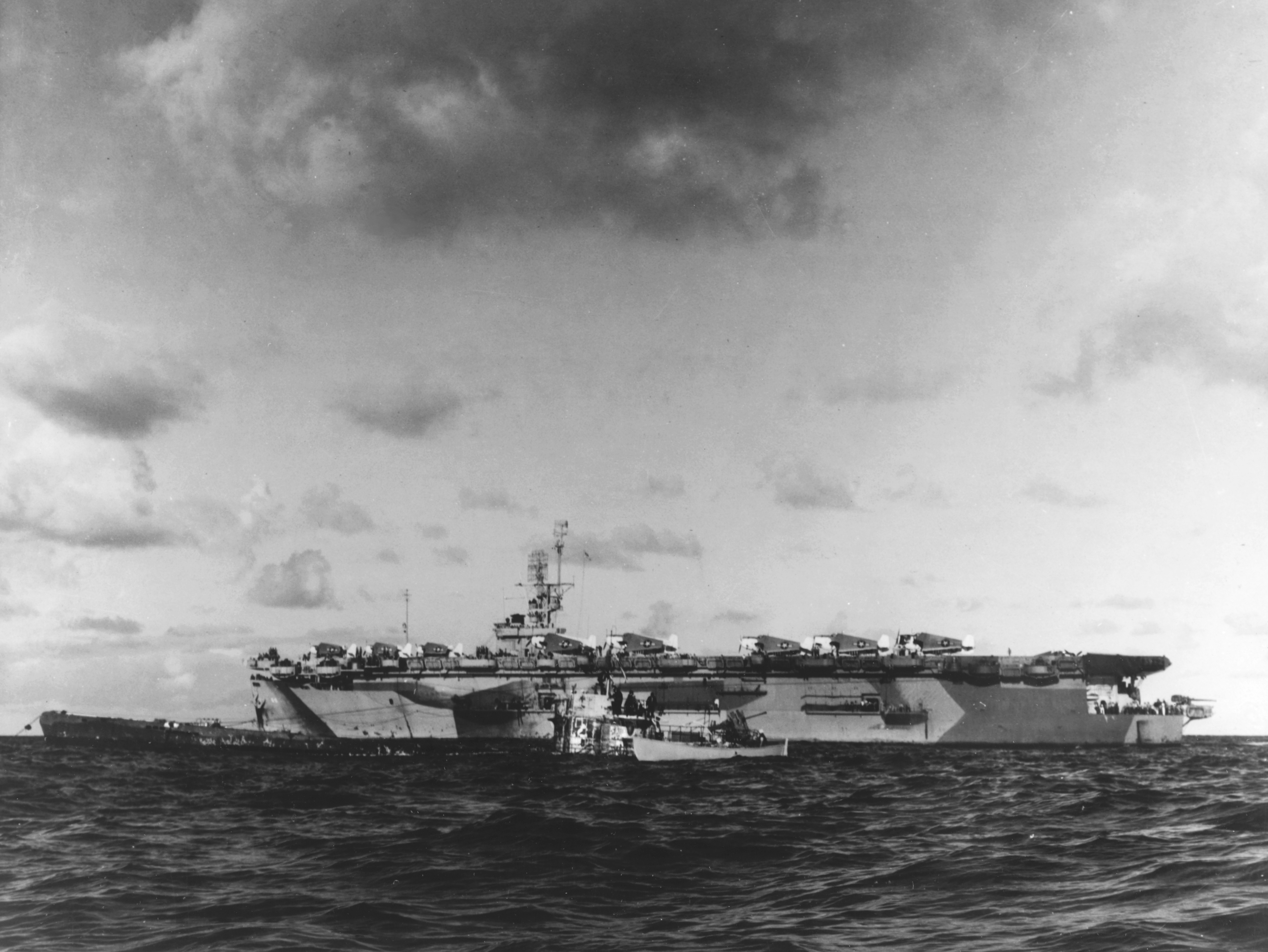
USS Guadalcanal lying alongside the captured U-505

Captain Gallery was keen to capture a U-boat and had encouraged his captains to plan for such an eventuality. Chatelain and Jenks collected survivors, while an eight-man party from Pillsbury led by Lt. Albert David came alongside the submarine in a boat and entered through the conning tower. They found the body of Signalman First Class Gottfried Fischer on the deck, the only fatality of the combat, and U-505 was deserted. They secured charts and codebooks, closed scuttling valves, disarmed demolition charges, and stopped her engines. The vessel was low in the water and down by the stern. U-boat researcher Derek Waller has written that a German crewman, Ewald Felix, helped foil the scuttling attempt.

Pillsbury attempted to take the submarine in tow, but repeatedly collided with her and had to move away with three compartments flooded. A second boarding party from Guadalcanal then rigged a towline from the aircraft carrier to the U-boat. Guadalcanal's chief engineer, Commander Earl Trosino, joined the salvage party. He disconnected the submarine's diesel engines from her electric driving motors, while leaving the latter clutched to the propeller shafts. With the U-boat moving under tow by Guadalcanal, the propellers spun as they passed through the water, turning the shafts and the driving motors. This caused the motors to act as electrical generators, charging the batteries. With power from the batteries, U-505's pumps cleared out the water let in by the attempted scuttling, and her air compressors blew out the ballast tanks, bringing her up to full surface trim.

Despite the capture taking place close to Allied-controlled French Morocco, Casablanca was known to be infiltrated by German spies, thus another safe port was needed to house the submarine. After three days of towing, Guadalcanal transferred U-505 to the fleet tug Abnaki. On 19 June, the submarine entered the Great Sound, site of the USN's Naval Operating Base in Bermuda, after a tow of 1,700 nautical miles (3,150 km; 1,960 mi). The USN took 58 prisoners from U-505, three of them wounded. The crew was interned at Camp Ruston, near Ruston, Louisiana, in great secrecy. Secrecy was so important to the mission that the submarine's flag was kept under the personal care of the commander-in-chief of the Atlantic Fleet during the duration of the war. The submarine's crewmen were isolated from other prisoners of war, and the Red Cross was denied access to them. The Kriegsmarine finally declared the crew dead and informed the families to that effect, and the crew was not returned until 1947.

== Awards ==
Historian Clay Blair states that U.S. Chief of Naval Operations Admiral Ernest King was furious with Gallery for endangering Ultra, the intelligence gained from Enigma decrypts, and considered court-martialling him. If the knowledge that a U-boat had been captured had reached Germany, the U-boat Arm would have made changes to tighten Enigma security, leading to an intelligence blackout on the eve of the Normandy landings. Since the British had gained access to Enigma with the captures of U-110 in 1941 and U-559 in 1942, the standard practice was to sink U-boats outright rather than trying to board and capture them, for this reason. However, "cooler heads prevailed".

Lieutenant Albert David received the Medal of Honor for leading the boarding party, the only time that it was awarded to an Atlantic Fleet sailor in World War II. Torpedoman's Mate Third Class Arthur W. Knispel and Radioman Second Class Stanley E. Wdowiak were the first two to follow David into the submarine, and they received the Navy Cross. Seaman First Class Earnest James Beaver received the Silver Star and Commander Trosino received the Legion of Merit. Captain Gallery conceived and executed the operation, and he received the Navy Distinguished Service Medal. The Task Group was awarded the Presidential Unit Citation. Admiral Royal E. Ingersoll, commander-in-chief, US Atlantic Fleet, cited the task group for "outstanding performance during antisubmarine operations in the eastern Atlantic" and stated that it was "a feat unprecedented in individual and group bravery, execution, and accomplishment in the naval history of the United States".

== Final journey ==
The arrival of U-505 in Chicago

The arrival of U-505 in Chicago

Documents regarding the transfer of the ship from the Department of Defense

The USN kept U-505 at the U.S. Naval Operating Base in Bermuda, and USN intelligence officers and engineers studied her intensively. To maintain the illusion that she had been sunk rather than captured, she was painted to look like a U.S. submarine and renamed USS Nemo. At the end of the war in Europe, she was used to promote E War Bond sales as part of the "Mighty 7th" War Loan drive. Anyone who purchased a bond could also purchase a ticket to board and inspect her. In June 1945, she visited New York City, Philadelphia, and Baltimore. Captain Gallery was present for the opening of the exhibition in Washington, DC.

The Navy had no further use for U-505 after the war. Experts had thoroughly examined her in Bermuda, and she was moored derelict at the Portsmouth Navy Yard, so the Navy decided to use her as a target for gunnery and torpedo practice until she sank. In 1946, Rear Admiral Gallery, who opposed the USN's plans for U-505, told his brother Father John Gallery about this plan, and Father John contacted President Lenox Lohr of Chicago's Museum of Science and Industry to see if they would be interested in her. The museum already planned to display a submarine, and the acquisition of U-505 seemed ideal. The U.S. government donated the submarine to the museum in September 1954, and Chicago residents raised $250,000 for transporting and installing the boat. Coast Guard tugboats and cutters towed the boat through the Great Lakes, making a stop in Detroit in July 1954. The museum dedicated her on 25 September 1954 as a permanent exhibit and a war memorial to all the sailors who died in the first and second Atlantic campaigns.

== Museum ship ==
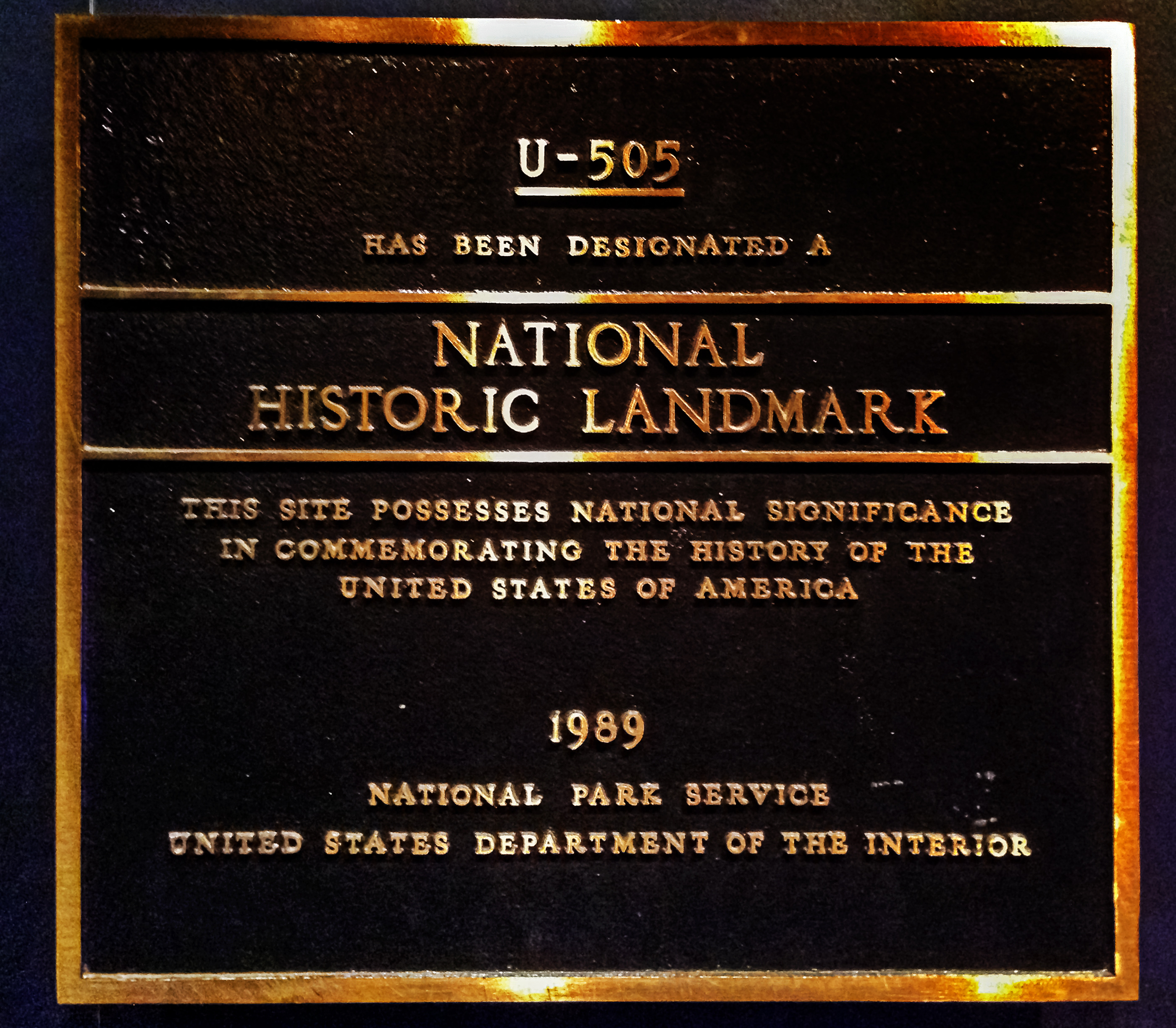
Marker at the Museum of Science and Industry

Nearly every removable part had been stripped from the boat's interior by the time she went to the museum; she was in no condition to serve as an exhibit, so museum director Lohr asked for replacements from the German manufacturers who had supplied the boat's original components and parts. Admiral Gallery reports in his autobiography Eight Bells and All's Well that every company supplied the requested parts without charge. Most included letters to the effect that the manufacturers wanted her to be a credit to German technology.

A reunion was held at the museum in 1964, 20 years after the ship's capture, where Gallery returned to Lange some binoculars from the ship that had belonged to him.

The USN had removed the periscope and placed it in a water tank used for research at its Arctic Submarine Laboratory in Point Loma, California, where it was forgotten. It was salvaged before the lab was demolished in 2003, and the USN donated it to the museum to be displayed along with the submarine. By 2004, the U-boat's exterior had suffered noticeable damage from the weather, so the museum moved her to a new, climate-controlled location (under ground next to the MSI) in April 2004. They restored and reopened her to the public on 5 June 2005.

In 2019, the museum refurbished the submarine, restoring her to be closer to her original condition. Also, a special exhibit with many additional artifacts from the submarine was opened in the general-admission section of the museum.

U-505 at the Museum of Science and Industry
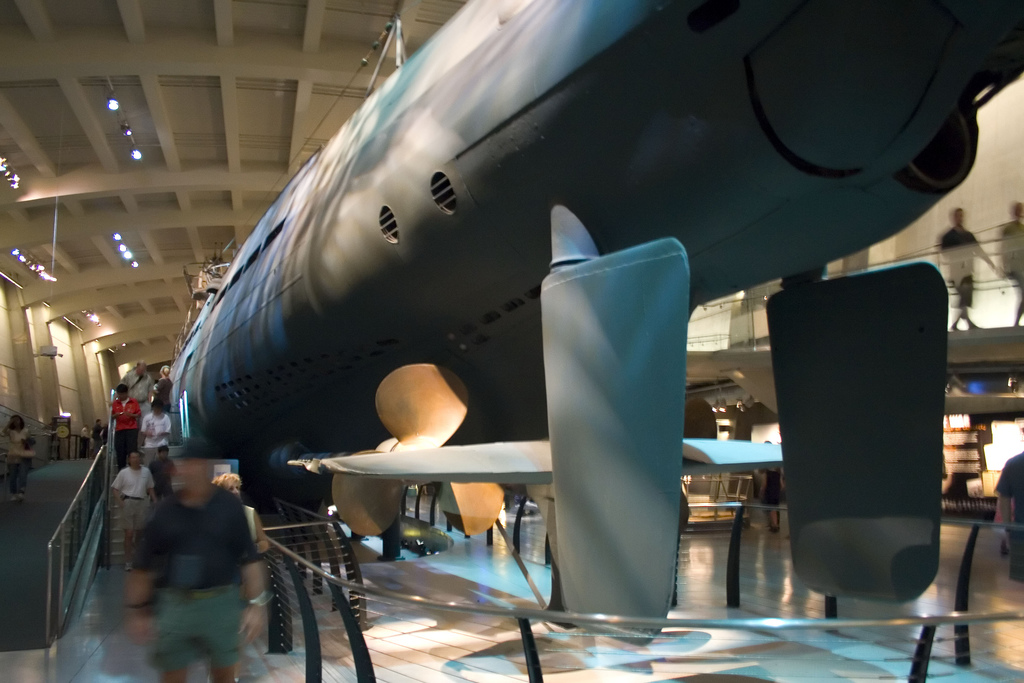
Underside of U-505

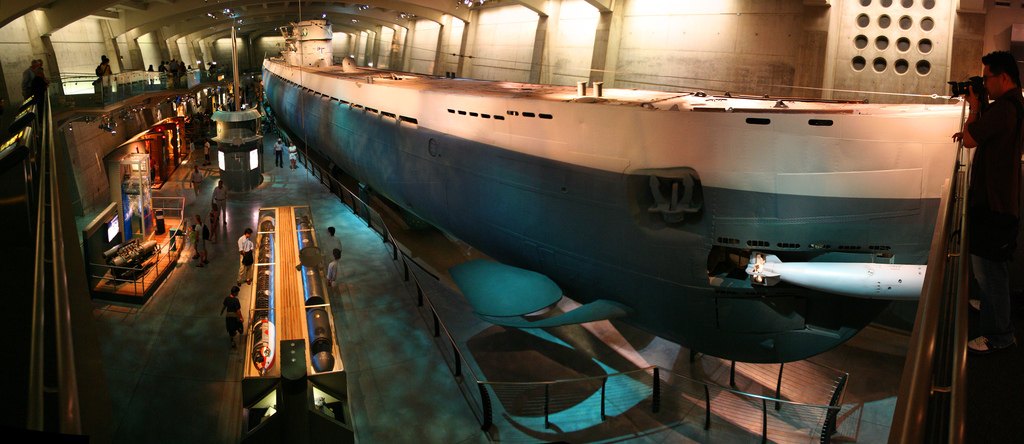
Wide-angle shot of U-505

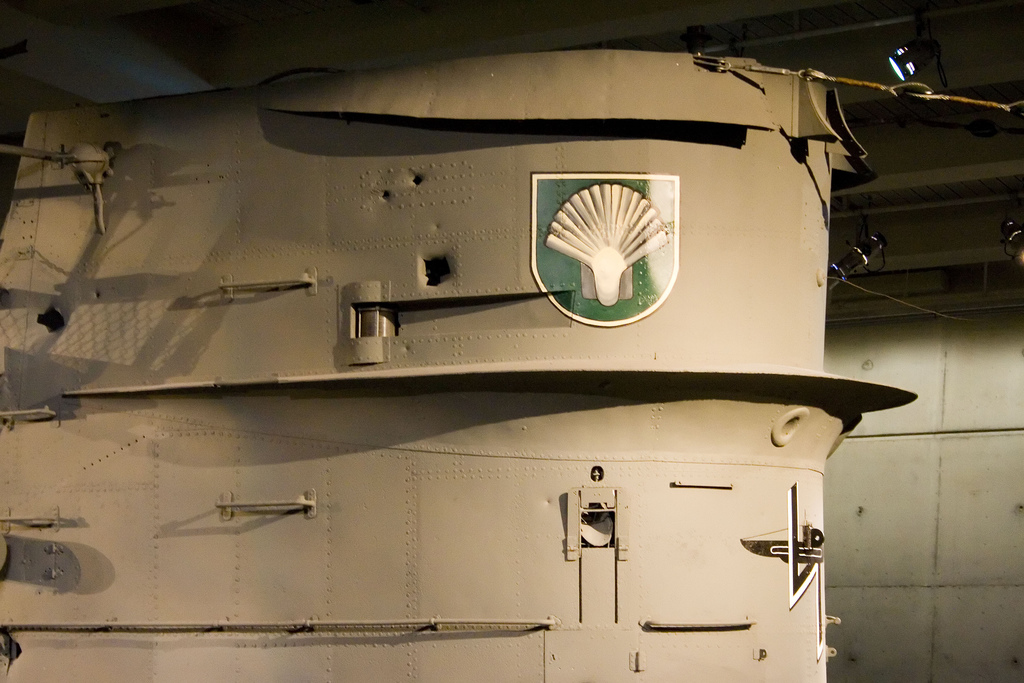
Conning tower of U-505, showing the badge of the flotilla to which she belonged: Shell damage received during her capture is visible.

U-505 outdoors as she was c. 1956
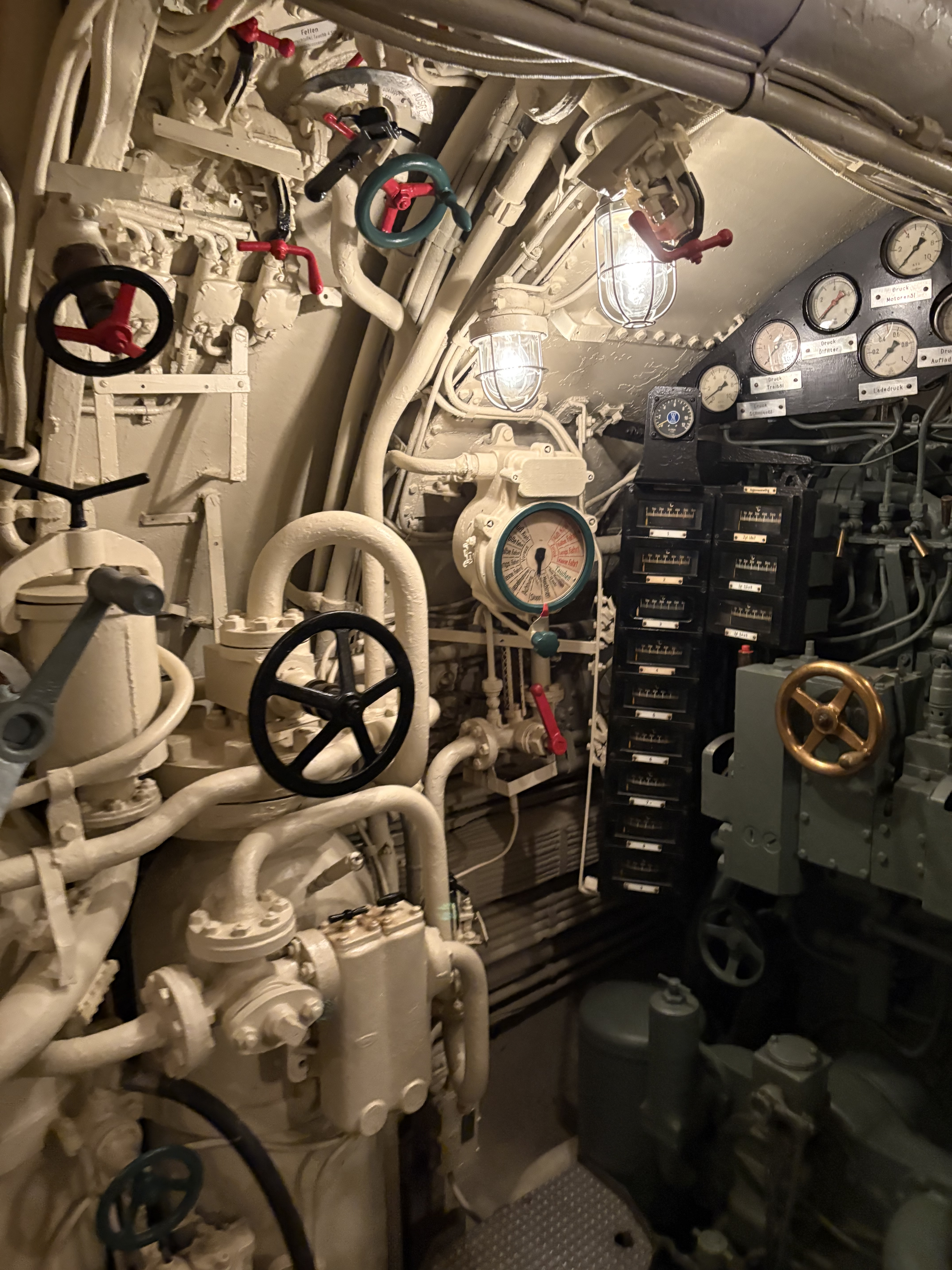
Interior of U-505 submarine, Science and Industry Museum, Chicago

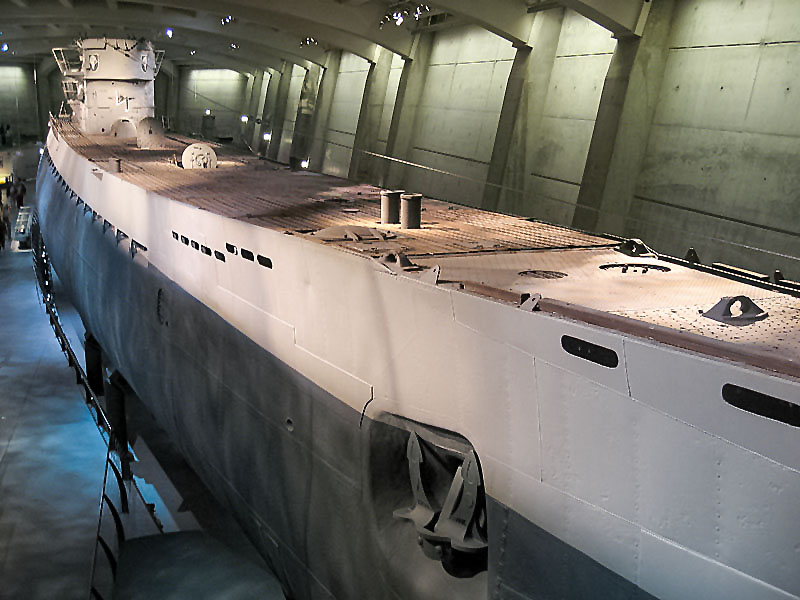
U-505 at the Griffin Museum of Science and Industry in Chicago

== In popular culture ==
Captain Gallery recounted the capture of U-505 in his 1951 memoir Clear the Decks. Gary Moore recounts a dramatized story of the captured crew in his 2006 historical fiction book Playing with the Enemy. Hans Goebeler recounts the story of the boat's patrols and her crew in his 2005 memoir Steel Boats, Iron Hearts: A U-Boat Crewman's Life Aboard U-505. Alexander Rose extensively documents the story of the USN's pursuit of the boat in his 2025 historical narrative Phantom Fleet: The Hunt for Nazi Submarine U-505 and World War II’s Most Daring Heist.

== Summary of raiding history ==
Date	Ship	Nationality	Tonnage (GRT)	Fate
5 March 1942	Benmohr	United Kingdom	5,920	Sunk
6 March 1942	Sydhav	Norway	7,587	Sunk
3 April 1942	West Irmo	United States	5,775	Sunk
4 April 1942	Alphacca	Netherlands	5,759	Sunk
28 June 1942	Sea Thrush	United States	5,447	Sunk
29 June 1942	Thomas McKean	United States	7,191	Sunk
22 July 1942	Urious	Colombia	153	Sunk
7 November 1942	Ocean Justice	United Kingdom	7,173	Sunk

== See also ==
=== Wartime captured German U-boats ===
- German submarine U-110 (1940)
- German submarine U-570, later HMS Graph
- German submarine U-559
- German submarine U-744
- German submarine U-1024

=== Surviving German U-boats ===
- SM U-1
- German submarine U-534
- German submarine U-995
- German submarine U-2540

=== Other ===
- List of submarine museums
- Playing With the Enemy
- U-571

== Bibliography ==
- Clay Blair : Hitler's U-Boat War Vol II:The Hunted 1942-1945 (1998). ISBN 0-304-35261-6
- Foster, Kevin J. (9 July 1988). "National Register of Historic Places Registration: U-505 (IXC U-Boat)" (pdf). National Park Service. Archived from the original on 1 August 2020.
  - "Accompanying Photos" (pdf). National Park Service. Archived from the original on 1 August 2020.
- Gallery, Daniel V. (1958). We Captured a U-Boat. London: The Popular Book Company.
- Gallery, Daniel V. (1978). U-505. New York: Warner Books. ISBN 0-446-32012-9
- Gallery, Daniel V. (2001). Twenty Million Tons Under the Sea. Naval Institute Press. ISBN 1-55750-806-2.
- Goebeler, Hans Jacob, with Vanzo, John. (1999) Steel Boats, Iron Hearts: The Wartime Saga of Hans Goebeler and U-505 (Wagnerian Publications). OCLC 45116124. This privately distributed paperback book was later reprinted as Steel Boat, Iron Hearts: A U-boat Crewman's Life aboard U-505. New York: Savas Beatie. 2008. ISBN 978-1-932714-31-9. OCLC 751578149.
  - Vanzo, John P. (6 December 2006) [July 1997]. "German Submarine U-505 Crewmember Hans Goebeler Recalls Being Captured During World War II". World War II. HistoryNet.
- Gröner, Erich; Jung, Dieter; Maass, Martin (1991). "U-boats and Mine Warfare Vessels". German Warships 1815–1945. Vol. 2. Translated by Thomas, Keith; Magowan, Rachel. London: Conway Maritime Press. ISBN 0-85177-593-4.
- Harris, Wesley. (2006). Fish Out of Water: Nazi Submariners as Prisoners in North Louisiana During World War II. RoughEdge Publications.
- Kemp, Paul (1999). U-Boats Destroyed – German Submarine Losses in the World Wars. London: Arms & Armour. ISBN 1-85409-515-3.
- Kohnen, David. "Tombstone of Victory: Tracking the U-505 From German Commerce Raider to American War Memorial, 1944–1954" in The Journal of America's Military Past (Winter 2007).
- Kohnen, David. Commanders Winn and Knowles: Winning the U-boat War with Intelligence, 1939–1943 (Enigma Press, 1999).
- Kohnen, David. "F-21 and F-211: A Fresh Look into the Secret Room" in Randy C. Bolano and Craig L. Symonds, ed., New Sources in Naval History: Selected Papers from the Fourteenth Naval History Symposium (Naval Institute, 2001).
- Moore, Gary W. (2006) Playing with the Enemy: A Baseball Prodigy, a World at War, and a Field of Broken Dreams. Savas Beatie LLC, New York.
- Rogers, J. David. "Capture of the U-505" (PDF). Missouri University of Science and Technology. Archived from the original (PDF) on 3 August 2012. Popular description of the capture of U-505 by a former naval officer and professor.
- Savas, Theodore P., Editor. (2004) Hunt and Kill: U-505 and the U-boat War in the Atlantic. Savas Beatie LLC, New York.
