= Playing with the Enemy =

2006 non-fiction book by Gary W. Moore

Gary W. Moore
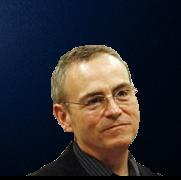
- Born: Gary Warren Moore; July 21, 1954; Kankakee, Illinois US
- Died: July 14, 2021 (aged 66)
- Occupation: Author / Speaker
- Writing career
- Notable work: Playing with the Enemy
- Website: garywmoore.com

Playing With the Enemy hard back cover

Playing With the Enemy by Gary W. Moore is a historical fiction account of Gene Moore, the author's father, whose professional baseball career with the Brooklyn Dodgers was interrupted by World War II. The title comes from the elder Moore's time as a guard in a top-secret prisoner of war camp that was holding the crew of a U-boat 505, a captured German submarine. The book was the winner of the 2006 Military Writers Society of America Book of the Year.

== Author ==
Gary Moore was an American speaker, award-winning author, business leader and musician. Moore was married to Arlene Moore (for 46 years), with their three children Toby, Tara Beth and Travis. Gary has been featured in publications such as Entrepreneur Magazine, Selling Power Magazine, Sales and Marketing Management Magazine, Impromptu Magazine and Southwest Airlines' Spirit Magazine, and was named the 1995 Chamber of Commerce Businessperson of the Year. In 1996, he was awarded the honorable Sam Walton Leadership Award and has appeared on CNN, ABC, CBS, NBC and Fox.
