= McMullen Naval History Symposium =

The McMullen Naval History Symposium is a biennial international academic conference held at the U.S. Naval Academy in Annapolis, Maryland devoted to the history of the world's navies. It has become the "largest regular meeting of naval historians in the world" and has been described as the U.S. Navy's "single most important interaction with [an] academic historical audience".

== History ==
This regular biennial series of symposia began as the U.S. Naval Academy Naval History Symposium. The first regular symposium was held in Annapolis on 27–28 April 1973, following a successful 1971 conference that had been conceived as an annual event and on a smaller scale with limited, invited participation. In 1977 for the Third Symposium, the Naval Academy History Department decided to expand the concept and model it along the lines of the academic conferences sponsored by the American Historical Association and the Organization of American Historians.

The conference that had been planned to open on 12 September 2001 was abruptly cancelled by the attacks that occurred in New York and Washington, D.C., on September 11, 2001 and left the future of the conference in grave doubt. It took four years for the Naval Academy's leadership to approve the resumption of the conference on a biennial schedule, but with strong support the series resumed with the Fifteenth Conference in 2007. Facilitating this, in 2006 the U.S. Naval Academy Alumni Foundation granted funds from the estate of Bill Daniels and the McMullen Seapower Lecture gift funds to support the symposium and to name it the McMullen Naval History Symposium in memory of Dr. John J. McMullen, Naval Academy Class of 1940, a naval architect, engineer, and sports club owner. Dr McMullen is also commemorated through a keynote McMullen Seapower lecture given at the symposium by the holder of the Class of 1957 Distinguished Chair of Naval Heritage.

The symposium has shown strength and growth in recent years. Despite the economic recession, more than two-hundred participants from seventeen countries attended the 2009 symposium. The 2011 symposium had over 250 in attendance over 125 papers presented.

== Fellowships ==
In 2009, the McMullen Seapower Fellowship was established for U.S Naval Academy faculty members to research, write, and deliver Seapower lectures at the biennial naval history symposium.

McMullen Seapower Fellows

- 2009 Marcus O. Jones, Virginia Lunsford, William McBride, and Lori Bogle.
- 2010 Phyllis Cullum
- 2011 Richard Ruth, Darrell Glaser and Ahmed Rahman, Miles Yu, Mary DeCredico
- 2013 Robert W. Love, Jr.

McMullen Post Doctoral Fellows In 2012, a postdoctoral fellowship was created and is to be filled biennially:

- 2012-1-2013: Jon Hendrickson

== Published Proceedings ==
- 1973 Symposium: Not published.
- 1975 Symposium: Not published.
- 1977 Symposium: Robert William Love, Jr., ed.,Changing Interpretations and New Sources in Naval History: Papers from the Third United States Naval Academy History Symposium. (New York and London: Garland Publishing, Inc., 1980).
- 1979 Symposium: Craig Symonds, et al. eds, New Aspects of Naval History: Selected Papers Presented at the Fourth Naval History Symposium, United States Naval Academy, 25–26 October 1979. (Annapolis, MD: Naval Institute Press, 1981).
- 1981 Symposium: Department of History, U.S. Naval Academy, ed., New Aspects of Naval History: Selected Papers from the 5th Naval History Symposium. (Baltimore, MD: Nautical and Aviation Publishing Company of America, 1985).
- 1983 Symposium: Daniel M. Masterson, General ed., Naval History: The Sixth Symposium of the U.S. Naval Academy. (Wilmington, DE: Scholarly Resources, Inc., 1987).
- 1985 Symposium: William B. Cogar, ed., Naval History: The Seventh Symposium of the U.S. Naval Academy. (Wilmington DE: Scholarly Resources, Inc., 1988).
- 1987 Symposium: William B. Cogar, ed., New Interpretations in Naval History. (Annapolis, MD: Naval Institute Press, 1989).
- 1989 Symposium: William R. Roberts with Jack Sweetman, eds., New Interpretations in Naval History: Selected Papers from the Ninth Naval History Symposium held at the United States Naval Academy, 18–20 October 1989. (Annapolis, MD: Naval Institute Press, 1991).
- 1991 Symposium: Jack Sweetman, ed. in chief, New Interpretations in Naval History: Selected Papers from the Tenth Naval History Symposium held at the United States Naval Academy, 11–13 September 1991. (Annapolis, MD: Naval Institute Press, 1989).
- 1993 Symposium: Robert Love， Lori Bogle， Brian VanDeMark， Maochun Yu， ed., "New Interpretations in Naval History: Selected Papers from the Eleventh Naval History Symposium held at the United States Naval Academy, 21–23 October 1993." (Annapolis, MD: Naval Institute Press, 2000).
- 1995 Symposium: William B. Cogar, ed., New Interpretations in Naval History: Selected Papers from the Twelfth Naval History Symposium held at the United States Naval Academy, 26–27 October 1995. (Annapolis: Naval Institute Press, 1997).
- 1997 Symposium: William M. McBride and Eric P. Reed, eds. New Interpretations in Naval History: Selected Papers from the Thirteenth Naval History Symposium held at Annapolis, 2–4 October 1997. (Annapolis: Naval Institute Press, 1998).
- 1999 Symposium: Randy Carol Balano and Craig L. Symonds, eds., New Interpretations in Naval History: Selected Papers from the Fourteenth Naval History Symposium held at Annapolis, 23–25 September 1999. (Annapolis: Naval Institute Press, 2001).
- 2001 Symposium: The September 11, 2001 attacks on New York and Washington caused the cancellation of the Fifteenth Naval History Symposium, just as attendees were beginning to gather in Annapolis. As a result, a selection of the papers that were intended to have been delivered in Annapolis was published in the first number of the first issue of the on-line International Journal of Naval History

No symposia were held in 2003 and 2005.

- 2007 Symposium: Maochun Yu, ed., New Interpretations in Naval History: Selected Papers from the Fifteenth Naval History Symposium held at the United States Naval Academy 20–22 September 2007. (Annapolis, MD: Naval Institute Press, 2009).
- 2009 Symposium: Craig C. Felker and Marcus O. Jones, eds., New Interpretations in Naval History: Selected Papers from the Sixteenth Naval History Symposium Held at the United States Naval Academy, 10–11 September 2009. Naval War College Historical Monograph Series, no. 20. (Newport: Naval War College Press, 2012).
- 2011 Symposium: Marcus O. Jones, ed., New Interpretations in Naval History: Selected Papers from the Seventeenth Naval History Symposium Held at the United States Naval Academy, 13–16 September 2011 Naval War College Historical Monograph Series. no. 23. (Newport: Naval War College Press, 2016).
- 2013 Symposium: Lori Lyn Bogle and James C. Rentfrow, eds, New Interpretations in Naval History:Selected papers from the Eighteenth McMullen Naval History Symposium Held at the U.S. Naval Academy 19–20, September 2013. Historical Monograph series, no. 25. (Newport: Naval War College Press, 2017)
- 2015 Symposium: In press.
- 2017 Symposium: In Press.
