= List of U-boat types =

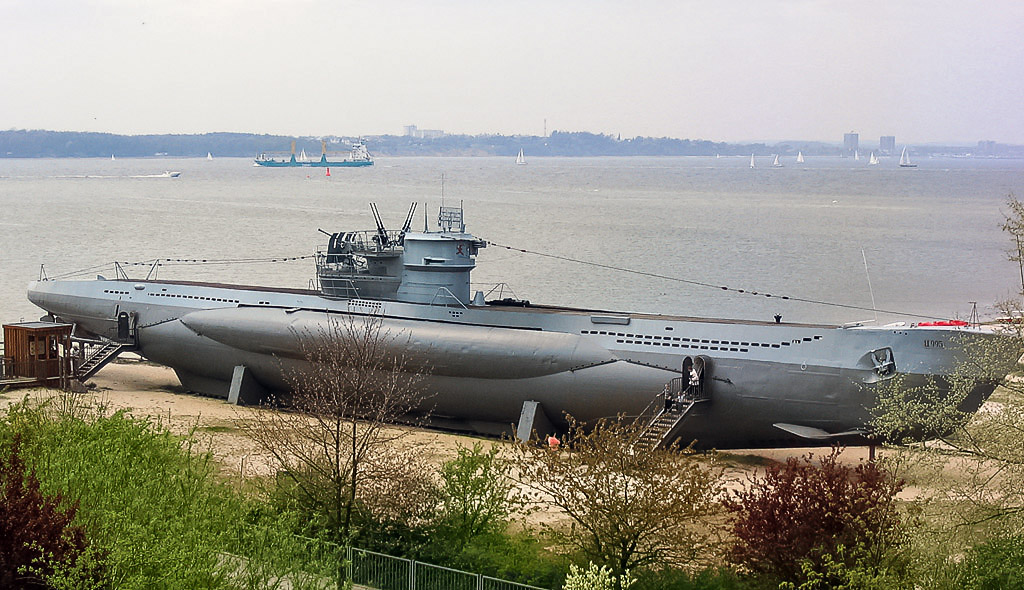
Type VIIC/41 U-boat

List of U-boat types contains lists of the German U-boat types (submarine classes) used in World War I and World War II.

The anglicized word U-boat is usually only used as reference for German submarines in the two World Wars and therefore postwar submarine in the Bundesmarine and later German Navy are not included.

In the period between the two World Wars the Reichsmarine of the Weimar Republic was not allowed to build submarines according to the Treaty of Versailles; development was undertaken secretly through a Dutch company NV Ingenieurskantoor voor Scheepsbouw before the mid-1930s. The terms of the Anglo-German naval agreement acknowledged the official building of new U-boats.

== World War I ==
This list contains the German U-boats types prior or during the First World War.

U-boat types of World War I
Type	Year of introduction	Number of U-boats completed
U-1	1906	1
U-2	1906	1
Type U 3	1907	2
Type U 5	1908	4
Type U 9	1908	4
Type U 13	1909	3
U-16	1909	1
Type U 17	1910	2
Type U 19	1910	4
Type U 23	1911	4
Type U 27	1912	4
Type U 31	1912	11
U-43	1914	8
U 51	1914	6
U 57	1914	6
U 63	1915	3
U 66	1913	5
U 81	1915	6
U 87	1915	6
U 93	1915	22
U 115	1916	0
U 127	1916	0
U 139	1916	3
U 142	1916	1
U 151	1916	7
UA	1912	1
UB I	1914	17
UB II	1915	30
UB III	1916	95
UC I	1914	15
UC II	1915	64
UC III	1916	16
UD 1	1918	0
UE I	1915	10
UE II	1916	9
UF	1918	0

== World War II ==
This list contains the German U-boats types prior or during the Second World War.

U-boat types of World War II
Type	Year of introduction	Number of U-boats built	Comments
IA	1934	2	Fleet going ocean boat modeled on World War I designs
IIA	1934	6	Prototype coastal patrol submarine
IIB	1935	20	Improved coastal patrol submarine
IIC	1937	8	Extended range coastal patrol submarine
IID	1939	16	Long range coastal patrol submarine
III		0	Design schematics created for a mine-layer submarine. Project was dropped due to design flaws
IIIA		0	Prototype small boat carrier designed to hold two fast torpedo boats. Project discontinued due to difficulties launching small boats in heavy seas
IV		0	First attempt at a designing a supply U-boat for replenishment at sea. Cancelled shortly after initial designs.
V	1940	1	Prototype boat, known as V-80, to test a chemical reaction engine.
VI		0	Prototype steam propulsion submarine
VIIA	1935	10	First practical post-World War I attack submarine
VIIB	1936	24	Standard attack submarine in the early months of World War II
VIIC	1938	568	Attack submarine "work horse" for the majority of World War II.
VIIC (Flak)	1942	4	Special variant of Type VII which removed the deck gun and added extra anti-aircraft guns
VIIC/41	1941	91	Upgraded attack boat with several additional offensive and defensive features as well as better diving ability.
VIIC/42	1942	0	Project was cancelled in lieu of contracts for the Type XXI electrical attack boats
VIID	1940	6	Mine layer submarine, few were produced
VIIE		0	Early designs indicate this was to be a deep diving submarine
VIIF	1941	4	Designed to be used as torpedo transport.
VIII		0	Intended as a fast attack submarine. Never went beyond initial designs
IXA	1936	8	First post World War I long range fleet ocean boat
IXB	1937	14	Standard pre-World War II fleet ocean boat
IXC	1939	54	Upgraded fleet ocean boat used in the opening years of World War II
IXC/40	1940	87	Enhanced fleet ocean boat with better diving abilities
IXD1	1940	2	Heavy diesel boat, suffered from numerous design flaws. Rebuilt as long range transports
IXD2	1940	28	Heavy diesel engine long range fleet boat. Heaviest and largest of the IX series
IXD/42	1942	2 (+ 4 cancelled)	Attempt to upgrade the heavy diesel engine design. Never deployed operationally
XA	1939	0	Designed to be used as mine layer. Retooled as the XB transport boat
XB	1939	8	Long range transport boat
XI	1937	0	"Cruiser submarine" with large deck guns. Project was cancelled
XII		0	Initial designs only. Listed as "Advanced Fleet Ocean Boat". Never developed.
XIII		0	Initial designs only. Listed as "Advanced Coastal Boat". Never developed.
XIV	1940	10	Designed to be used as supply U-boat. Known by the nickname "Milk Cow"
XV		0	Initial designs only. Listed as "Long Range Transport Boat". Never developed.
XVI		0	Initial designs only. Listed as "Long Range Repair Boat". Never developed.
XVIIA	1942	4	Fast attack boat with chemical propulsion system
XVIIB	1943	3	Upgraded version of the XVIIB with slightly better abilities
XVIIG	1944	0	Upgraded version of the Type XVII. Boats were ordered but never deployed
XVIIK		0	Prototype for a closed cycle diesel engine submarine. Never advanced beyond initial designs
XVIII	1943	0	2 laid down, not completed. Intended for use as an advanced fast attack boat
XIX		0	Initial designs only. Listed as "Long range mine layer". Never developed.
XX		0	Prototype for a "Long range transport boat". Project cancelled.
XXI	1943	118	Most advanced U-boat of the Second World War. The first of the "electrical boat" designs
XXII		0	Prototype for an "Advanced coastal boat". Project cancelled.
XXIII	1943	61	Late war fast attack submarine, using the electrical boat design
XXIV		0	Initial designs only. Listed as "Advanced fleet ocean boat". Never developed.
XXV		0	Initial designs only. Listed as "Advanced coastal boat". Never developed
XXVI		0	Prototype for a "High speed attack boat". Project cancelled.
XXVIIA	1944	53	Midget submarine "Hecht"
XXVIIB	1944	285	Midget submarine "Seehund"

== See also ==
- List of naval ships of Germany
- List of naval ship classes of Germany
