= Glückauf =

Glückauf may refer to

- Glück auf, the traditional German miners' greeting
- Glückauf-Kampfbahn, a sports stadium in Gelsenkirchen, Germany
- SS Glückauf, a number of ships with this name.
- Eugen Glueckauf (1906 – 1981), German-born British expert on nuclear power
- Son of Mine, a 2015 Dutch crime film directed by Remy van Heugten
