= Ingenieurbüro Glückauf =

The Ingenieurbüro Glückauf ('Glück auf Engineering Bureau') was a department of the Reich Ministry of Armaments and War Production, which during the Second World War was the design office of the Hauptausschuß Schiffbau. It completed construction and production plans for U-Boats of the Kriegsmarine. This affected both submarine types that were designed for the U-boat war, as well as midget submarines which were used by the small combat units of the Kriegsmarine. The bureau's name derives from Glück auf! ('Luck out!'), a traditional miner's greeting meaning "good luck."

== Tasks, projects and localization ==
The Ingenieurbüro Glückauf was abbreviated as IBG. It was entrusted with the design and production planning of German submarines for the Navy during the final phases of World War II, for example the Type XXI submarine or the Type XXVII submarine.

Towards the end of 1944, the design and production planning for the Type XXVI, which used the Walter engine, was completed. For this purpose, the IBG designers produced construction drawings in the partial sheet system, from which the sequence of production and assembly could be seen. This method was used for the first time in German shipbuilding in the construction of the Type XXVI. Previously, the partial blade system was only used in inland steel construction.

The IBG was one of the central design offices of the Hauptausschuß Schiffbau (HAS) and had two branches in the Harz highlands. In the offices in Blankenburg and Halberstadt there were an average of 650 employees from summer 1943 to March 1945.
