= Type XXVI submarine =

German submarine project during WWII

- Rendering of a Type XXVI submarine

Class overview
- Builders: Blohm & Voss, Hamburg
- Operators: Kriegsmarine (planned)
- Preceded by: Type XXI submarine
- Built: 1945
- Planned: 100
- Canceled: 100

General characteristics
- Displacement: 842 t (829 long tons) (surfaced); 926 t (911 long tons) (submerged)
- Length: 56.2 m (184 ft 5 in)
- Beam: 5.45 m (17 ft 11 in)
- Draft: 5.9 m (19 ft 4 in)
- Propulsion: Walter turbine, 7,500 PS (5,516 kW; 7,397 shp); 1 × Diesel motor, 580 PS (427 kW; 572 shp); 1 × Electric motor, 71 PS (52 kW; 70 shp)
- Speed: 11 knots (20 km/h; 13 mph) (surfaced); 24 knots (44 km/h; 28 mph) - 25 knots (46 km/h; 29 mph) (submerged)
- Range: 7,300 nmi (13,500 km; 8,400 mi) at 10 knots (19 km/h; 12 mph) surfaced; 158 nmi (293 km; 182 mi) at 22 knots (41 km/h; 25 mph) submerged (HTP drive); 45 nmi (83 km; 52 mi) at 6 knots (11 km/h; 7 mph) submerged (electric drive)
- Test depth: 135 m (443 ft)
- Complement: 3 officers, 30 enlisted
- Armament: 10 × 533 mm (21 in) torpedo tubes

The Type XXVI was a German submarine project towards the end of the Second World War. Only four boats began construction, none of which were completed.

== Concept ==
After the use of electric propulsion in submarine construction in the course of the development of the Type XXI and XXIII submarines, the designs of Types XVII, XVIII and XXII by Walterwerke were not pursued any further. When it turned out that the XXI boats were too large and expensive for use in the Western Approaches, the Kiel family company saw the opportunity for a "Walter U-boat" again and on October 12, 1943, presented a concept with the designation XXVIA. On March 28 of the following year, the Commander-in-Chief of the Navy, Karl Dönitz, decided to have the boat built under the type designation XXVIW (for Walter). A week later, the naval war command formulated the requirements that the new type of boat had to meet, which was now given the designation XXVI. Then the Ingenieurbüro Glückauf (IBG) was entrusted with the final design and instructed to also prepare the construction of the boats. The IBG designed the production of the Type XXVI boats in the so-called Modular design. For this purpose, the construction of 8 raw sections of the respective boat should take place in a steel construction company and, based on this, the individual sections should then be manufactured at specialized submarine shipyards. Finally, these sections were to be delivered to a large shipyard and assembled there to form a submarine. Type XXVI was designed as a deep-sea submarine with Walter propulsion, which should accelerate it to an underwater speed of 44 km/h (27 mph). It would have had a crew of three officers and 30 men. On May 26, the construction contract for 100 boats of this type was given to the Schichau shipyard in Gdansk, which already had relevant experience with section building through the manufacture of the Type XXI boats.

== Armament ==
The armament consisted of ten torpedo tubes, four of them on the bow. During the development of the German submarines, which were to be equipped with a Walter drive, no torpedo tubes were planned at the stern, because the "Walter boats" had a sealed turbine room there, which complicated the operation of the rear torpedo tubes. For this reason, the Type XXVI was designed with six side torpedo tubes, which were located at the level of the command room, and were directed at an angle to the rear. Each torpedo tube on the boat was to be equipped with a torpedo. Reserve torpedoes were not provided, so that the time-consuming loading of the torpedo tubes during the journey was not necessary. About every 3-4 days, pulling the torpedoes out of the tubes by about 2.5 m for maintenance was only possible if some of the bunks in the crew compartment in the bow were folded up. There were no forms of anti-aircraft weapons on any of the submarines.

== Construction ==
Type XXVI pressure hull, port side view, circa 1945. The "breaks" was to accommodate side-angled torpedo tubes.

The Hauptausschuß Schiffbau (main committee of shipbuilding) presented a production plan in early May 1944 that a total of 66 boats were planned to be completed for the year 1945, with volume production to begin in May 1945 After a revision of the production times planned by the IBG – eight weeks for the raw sections, six weeks for the construction of each section and seven weeks for the assembly – the number to be produced was increased to 74 boats for 1945. The order for the production of 100 boats – U 4501 to U 4600 – was first placed on May 6, 1944, at the Schichau shipyard in Danzig, who already had relevant experience with the construction of sections through the production of the Type XXI boats. The amount of crude steel required for the hundred boats was estimated at 46,240 t. On August 27 of the same year, the order was accepted by the Blohm + Voss shipyard. The Hamburg shipyard specialized in the assembly of Walter systems as well as in the assembly of sections. Upon acceptance, the first five boats were expected to be delivered by March (U 4501), April (U 4502), June (U 4503 and U 4504) and July (U 4505) the following year. On January 22, as part of emergency shipbuilding measures, the Hauptausschuß Schiffbau reduced the number of orders by one. By the end of the war, some sections for U 4501 to U 4504 were under construction. The other plans were no longer implemented.

Under the Allied occupation arrangements, the Soviet Union took control of most of the submarine shipyards in northern Germany. Pursuant to an inter-Allied agreement, it received four submarines equipped with snorkels, along with unassembled components for an additional twenty to thirty snorkel systems, as well as an estimated 75 unassembled Type XXVI “Walter” submarines. In Stettin and Danzig, Soviet forces also seized a considerable number of Type XXI and Type XXIII electric submarines—which are widely regarded as the technical foundation for Soviet submarine development in the postwar years.

== See also ==
- List of U-boat types
- List of submarine classes
- Uncompleted U-boat projects

== Bibliography ==
- Rössler, Eberhard (2001) [1981]. The U-boat: The Evolution and Technical History of German Submarines. London: Cassell. ISBN 0-304-36120-8.
