= Uncompleted U-boat projects =

List of cancelled and invasion-aborted World War II German submarine designs

During World War II, Nazi Germany's Kriegsmarine considered various submarine designs for specialized operations or improving U-boat performance. Many of these designs did not come to fruition for various reasons; some were abandoned due to practical considerations, while others towards the end of the war had to be abandoned as the yards where they were being built were overrun by allied forces.

== List of projects cancelled or not put in production ==
- Type III U-boat - was a 1934 project for a purpose-built minelayer based on the Type IA U-boat. The Type III U-boat would have been similar to the Type IA, but with a hull lengthened by 7.5 m, and a total displacement of 970 tons. The Type III U-boat was planned to carry an armament of 54 to 75 mines (depending on the type carried), two 105-mm deck guns, and one 20-mm antiaircraft gun. No contracts were granted for these boats.
- Type IIIA U-boat - originally known as Type VII, was a planned minelayer similar to the Type IA U-boat. It would have had a larger outer hull than the Type IA, and featured a large, watertight cylindrical hangar on the aft deck, which would have carried two small motor torpedo boats. The boat would have carried 48 mines, and used the smaller boats to help lay and recover mines. The project was dropped as impractical.
- Type IV U-boat - was a planned resupply and repair U-boat, intended to meet other U-boats at sea and resupply them with torpedoes, fuel, food/water, and spare parts (similar in concept to the later Type XIV), and also be capable of performing light repair work. No contracts were granted for these boats.
- Type V U-boat - was an experimental design by Hellmuth Walter for a 300 tons submarine, propulsed by diesel engines which were fed by air on the surface and oxygen from decomposed hydrogen peroxide submerged. The heat of the decomposing hydrogen peroxide was also used to generate steam to drive a turbine.
- Type VI U-boat - was a planned conversion of Type IA U-boats to run both submerged and surfaced from steam propulsion. No contracts were granted for these boats.
- Type VIIE U-boat - was planned to make use of a lightweight engine, and with the saved weight, increase the thickness of the pressure hull - thus allowing for greater diving depths. The project was cancelled.
- Type VIII U-boat - little information is available other than it was planned for production in the event of mobilization in 1935.
- Type XI U-boat - was planned as a submarine cruiser; its main armament would have been four 128-mm guns, in two twin gun turrets. It would have also carried an Arado Ar 231 collapsible floatplane. Four boats (U-112, U-113, U-114, and U-115) were laid down in 1939, but cancelled at the outbreak of World War II. Had the Type XI U-boat been constructed, it would have had a submerged displacement of 4,650 tons – by far the largest of the U-boats and the second-largest diesel submarine after the Japanese I-400-class submarine. Its purpose was to operate in far oceans as a commerce raider.
- Type XII - a fleet U-boat design from 1938. It had eight torpedo tubes, six at the bow and two at the stern, and was to carry 20 torpedoes. The gun armament was to be the same as for the Type IX boats. Designed size equal to the later, larger Type IX version IXD model, but with even more powerful engines and motors planned, allowing faster speeds both above and below the surface. No contracts were granted for these boats.
- Type XIII - was a further development of the Type II coastal U-boat, with four torpedo tubes and one 20-mm antiaircraft gun. No contracts were granted for these boats.
- Type XV and XVI U-boats - were intended for very large transport and repair boats (5,000-ton and 3,000-ton, respectively) intended to carry torpedoes, food, and oil as cargo. The engine layout was to be the same as for the VIIC. No contracts were granted for these boats.
- Type XVIII U-boat - was a project for an attack boat using the Walter propulsion system. Two boats (U-796 and U-797) were laid down in 1943, but construction was cancelled in March 1944.
- Type XIX - was a project for an unarmed transport U-boat, based on the Type XB mine layer.
- Type XX - another project for a transport U-boat based on the Type XB; it would have had a shorter hull than the Type XB, but had a greater beam and draft. Thirty Type XX U-boats were laid down in 1943, but construction stopped in 1944. In August 1944, construction on three Type XX U-boats (U-1701, U-1702, and 1703) resumed, but again stopped in early 1945.
- Type XXII U-boat - was intended for coastal and Mediterranean use. They used the Walter propulsion system and would have had a crew of two officers and 10 men. They were to have three torpedo tubes, two at the bow (below the construction water line) and one aft of the bridge (above the construction water line). Initially, 72 contracts were awarded to Howaldtswerke (36 to the yard in Hamburg and 36 in Kiel), but of those, only two had been laid down and had received U-boat numbers (U-1153 and U-1154) before they were all cancelled in late 1943.
- Type XXIV U-boat - was a 1943 design for an ocean-going U-boat using the Walter system. It was to have 14 torpedo tubes, six at the bow, and four each side aft. No contracts were granted.
- Type XXV U-boat - was intended to be electric propulsion-only for coastal use. The design was 160 tons and would have had two torpedo tubes fitted at the bow. No contracts were granted for these boats.
- Type XXVI - was a high-seas U-boat propelled by the Walter system. It would have had a crew of three officers and 30 men, with ten torpedo tubes, four at the bow and six in a so-called Schnee organ, and no deck guns; 100 contracts were initially awarded to the Blohm & Voss yard in Hamburg (U-4501 through U-4600) and sections were under construction for U-4501 through U-4504 when the war ended. The other contracts had been cancelled.

== See also ==
Major U-boat classes

- Type I
- Type II
- Type VII
- Type IX
- Type X
- Type XIV - used to resupply other U-boats; nicknamed the Milk Cow
- Type XVII
- Type XXI
- Type XXIII
- Midget submarines, including Biber, Hai, Molch, Seehund
