= SS Glückauf =

A number of ships were named Glückauf, including –

- Glückauf (1886), the first oil tanker, built in 1886 and wrecked in the 1890s at Fire Island, New York
- SS Glückauf (1912), a German cargo ship that sank in 1939
- SS Glückauf (1930), a German cargo ship in service 1939–40
