= Bundeswehr Museum of German Defense Technology =

Military and war museum in Germany

WTS-Koblenz
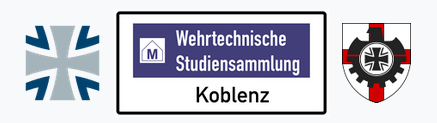

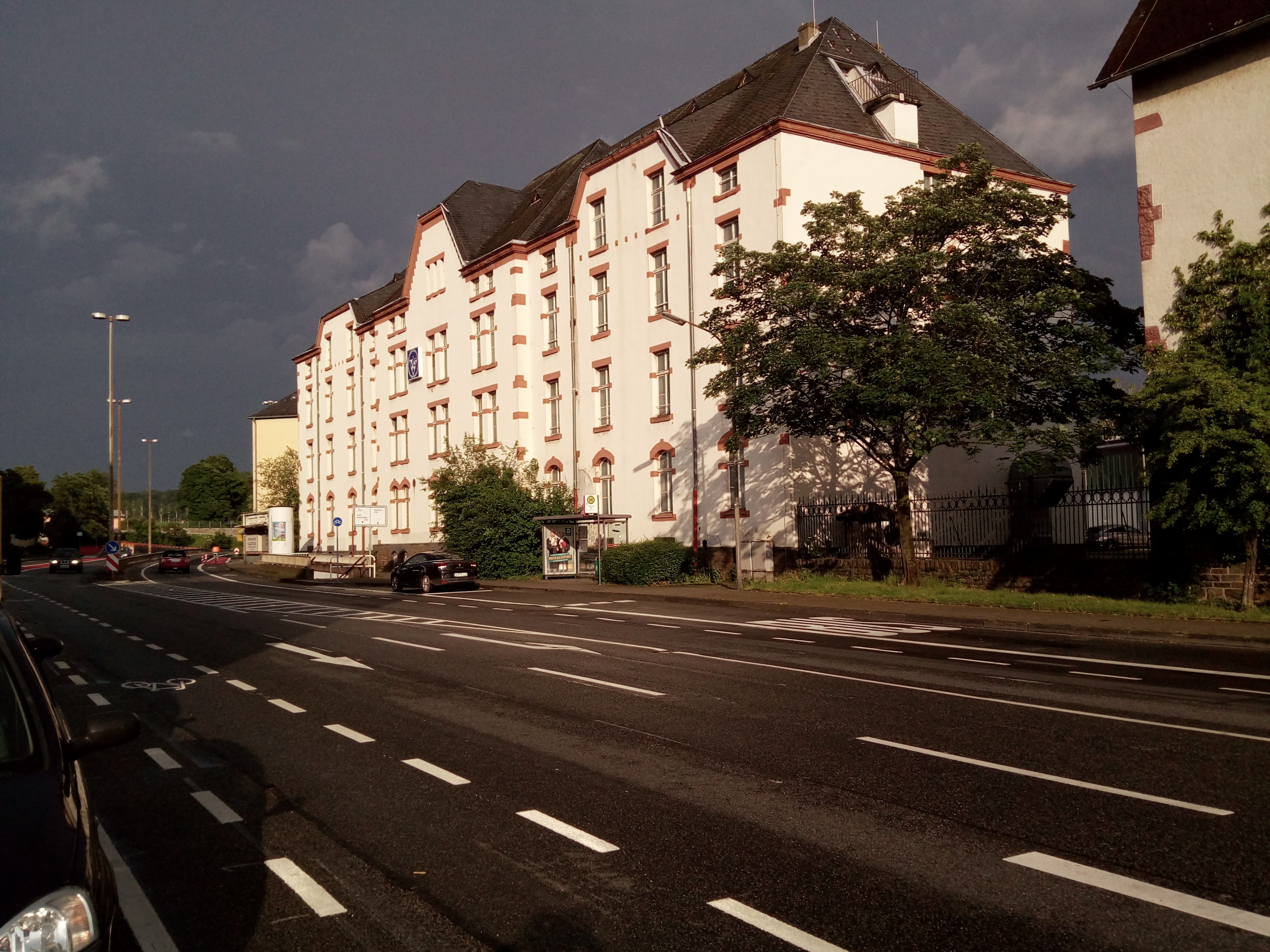
- Building complex of the Wehrtechnische Studiensammlung in the former Langemarck barracks
- Location: Koblenz, Germany
- Coordinates: 50°22′08″N 7°35′08″E
- Type: Military history
- Website: www.bundeswehr.de/de/organisation/ausruestung-baainbw/organisation/wehrtechnische-studiensammlung

The Bundeswehr Museum of German Defense Technology also known as Wehrtechnisches Museum Koblenz and Wehrtechnische Studiensammlung Koblenz (WTS-Koblenz) is the official Bundeswehr's Defense Technology Study Collection in Koblenz. It is one of Germany's important technical military exhibitions, with about 30,000 objects on an exhibition area of around 7,000 square metres (75,000 sq ft). It is known as one of the most extensive collections of its kind internationally. The main focus of the museum is on defense technology and the military science library. It is a subsidiary of the Federal Office of Bundeswehr Equipment, Information Technology and In-Service Support (BAAINBw – formerly the Federal Office of Defense Technology and Procurement).

== History ==
The initial history of the WTS kicks off with the Krupp firing range in Meppen, which was established by Friedrich Krupp AG from 1877. The eventful history of the site and the holdings there during the First World War, the period of the Treaty of Versailles, the Second World War until the takeover of the properties by the Bundeswehr is documented only scarsly. Although there was considerable testing of weapons and equipment prior to 1945, only a few exhibits from this period, such as an early Bouclier roulant personnel carrier, have been transferred to the WTS. Pieces such as the Salvator Dormus self-loading pistol were also transferred from earlier holdings of the Army Weapons Office and the Wehrmacht from their collections on the history of defense and weapons technology.

As a purposeful study collection, a predecessor institution of the WTS was established in 1961–62 as the "Collection of Weapons and Design Studies", initially at what was then Test Site 91 in Meppen/Emsland, on the former site of the Krupp firing range. On 12 November 1982, the facility was opened as the Wehrtechnische Studiensammlung in the former Langemarck barracks in Koblenz by the former President of the German Bundestag, Richard Stücklen. It was now directly subordinate to the Federal Office of Defense Technology and Procurement. The WTS was expanded in particular by the military historian Arnold Wirtgen, who was in charge of the WTS until 1988. From 1995 to 2021, the management was in the hands of his son Rolf Wirtgen. Since 2001, the WTS has participated in the Koblenz Long Night of Museums with a large number of visitors.

On 1 October 2012, the subordination of the WTS changed to the newly established Federal Office of Bundeswehr Equipment, Information Technology and In-Service Support (BAAINBw). Since the beginning of the COVID-19 pandemic, the WTS has been closed to visitors.

Since 2023 the WTS is open to the public again.

== Tasks ==
=== Tasks within the framework of the Bundeswehr ===
The purpose of the collection is first of all to fulfill the core tasks of the service:

- Tasks as a company archive of the BAAINBw
- Participation in the training of employees in the armaments sector, in particular of junior engineers in the field of defense technology
- Supporting the Bundeswehr in preparatory training for foreign missions and international arms control missions
- Provision of technical expertise for other departments of the Federal Government
- Cooperation in the Working Group of Military History Museums and Collections of the German Armed Forces

In addition, it operates a specialized defense technology and military science library with approx. 18,000 volumes and more than 30,000 technical service regulations. This library is for official use only.

These tasks determine the personnel and financial resources of the Wehrtechnische Studiensammlung from the federal budget.

=== Tasks in the service of the public ===
The WTS is open to the public. Since 1982, about 1,000,000 people have visited the collection. It is generally perceived as a museum, published accordingly in local museum directories, and signposted as such. However, the WTS is not a museum by the definition of the Bundeswehr. As an official museum, the BMVg division operates the Military History Museum of the Bundeswehr in Dresden, which maintains various branch offices. For the WTS in Koblenz, this has consequences for the presentation and the mediation formats. A comprehensive museum concept, detailed military-historical descriptions, examples of use or armament-historical classifications are mostly missing.

The WTS offers a thematically arranged special collection with a wealth of illustrative material on the development of armament, equipment, gear and uniforms from the early 19th century onwards, with a focus on the Bundeswehr. In connection with the service-related purpose of the collection for documentation and training, the exhibits are not demilitarized and are mostly fully functional.

Today, the WTS is one of the largest collections of its kind in Europe, with about 30,000 collection items on about 7,000 m^{2} of exhibition space.

== Exhibition ==
The collection and exhibition focuses on:

- Small arms and machine guns
- Artillery technology
- Missile technology
- Anti-tank hand weapons
- Wheeled and tracked vehicles
- Pioneer technology
- Aircraft and naval technology
- telecommunication, electronic and optical equipment
- personal clothing and equipment

The exhibits mainly belong to the Bundeswehr. Experimental and prototype items originate from project developments and research projects, which were mainly carried out within the framework of the tasks of the various defense technology departments. The change of exhibits serves especially to update the exhibition. When new exhibits are put on display, others go to external storage facilities, are lent out or handed over, this almost exclusively in the area of the Bundeswehr. A representative selection of 30,000 exhibits presents a cross-section of the collection.

The following selection shows exhibits and the range of the exhibition, which is fanned out from historical small parts to large military equipment and watercraft.

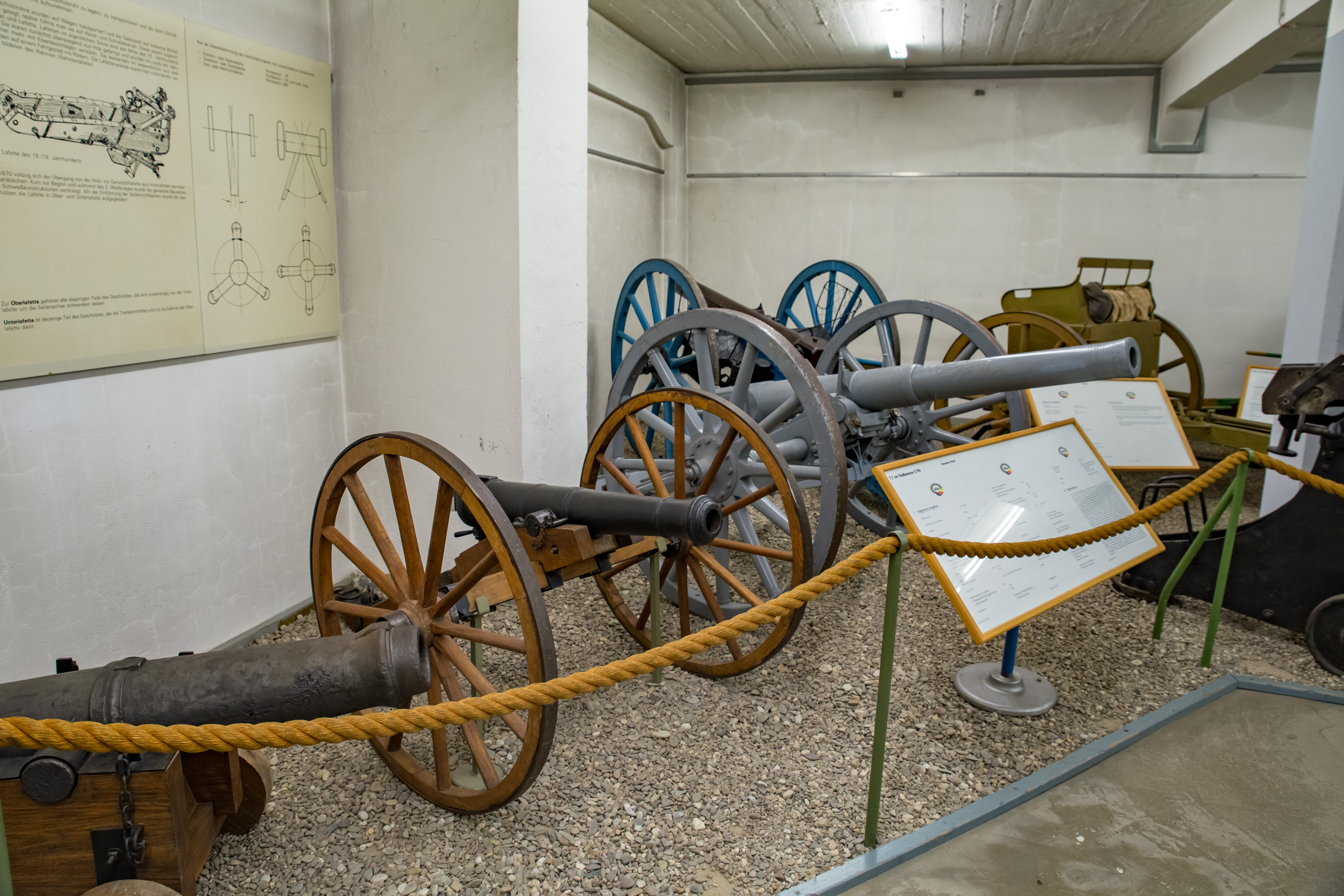
Historic Field guns.

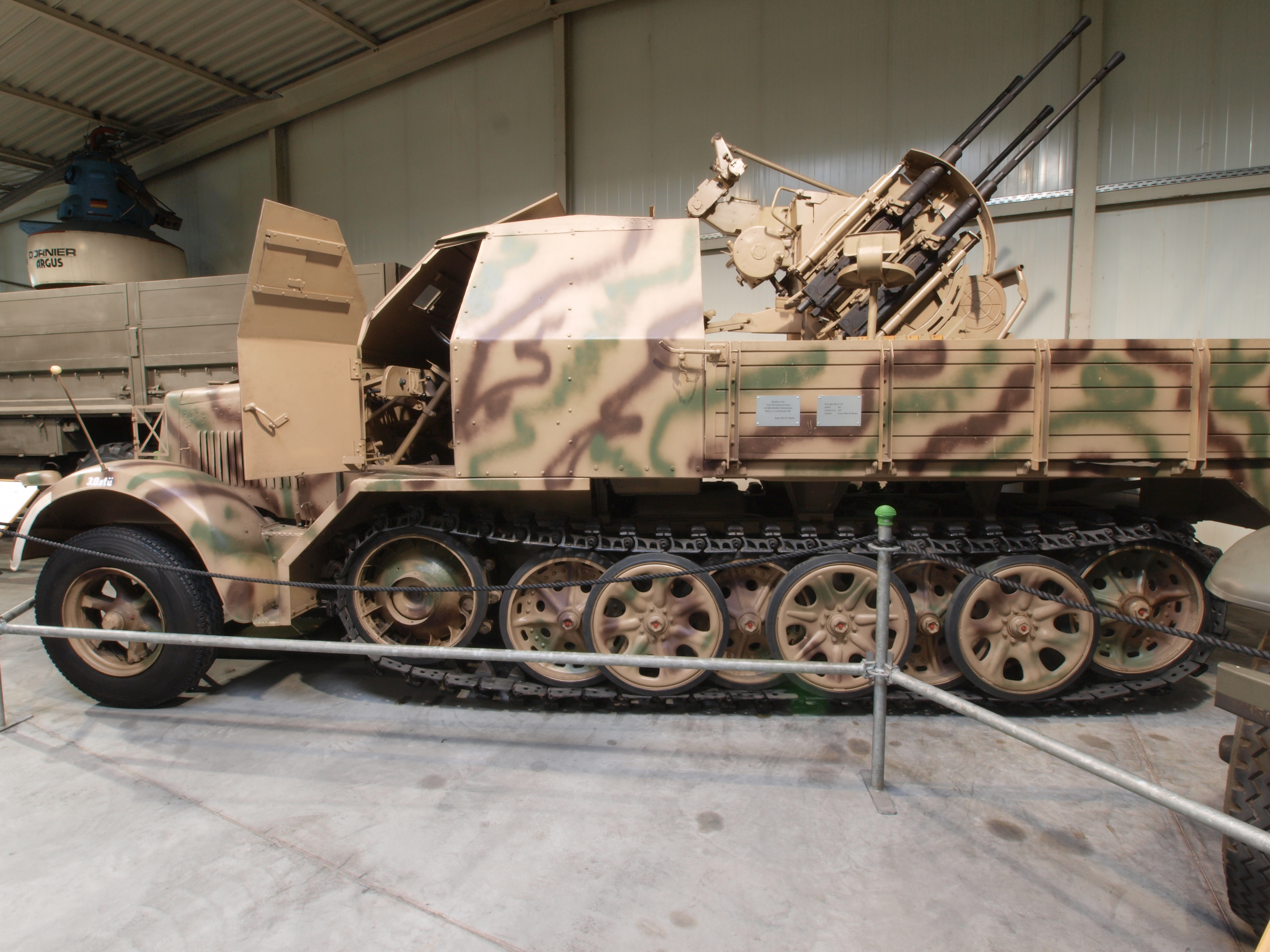
Sd.Kfz. 7 with 2 cm Flakvierling 38.

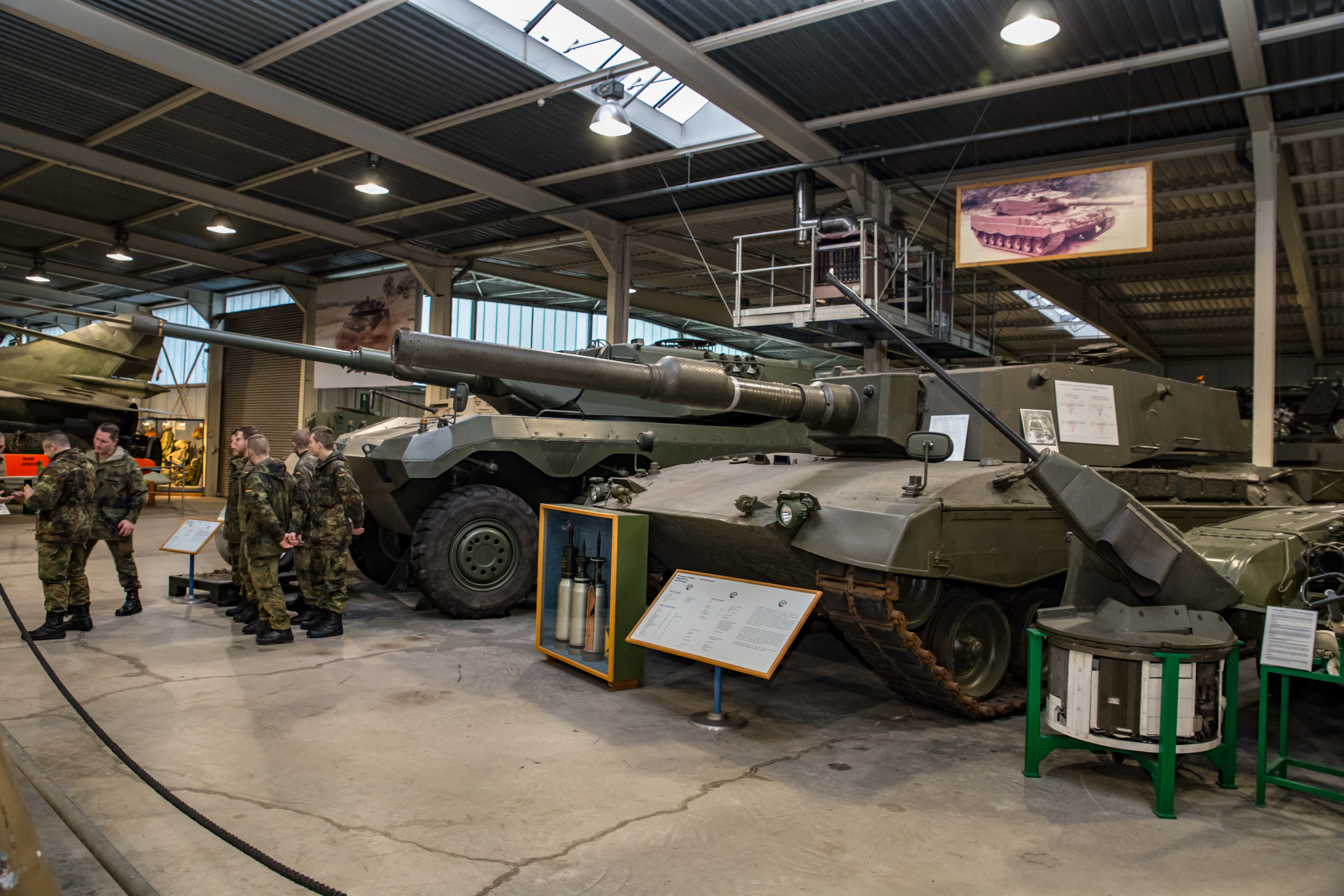
Prototype of Leopard 2 main battle tank.

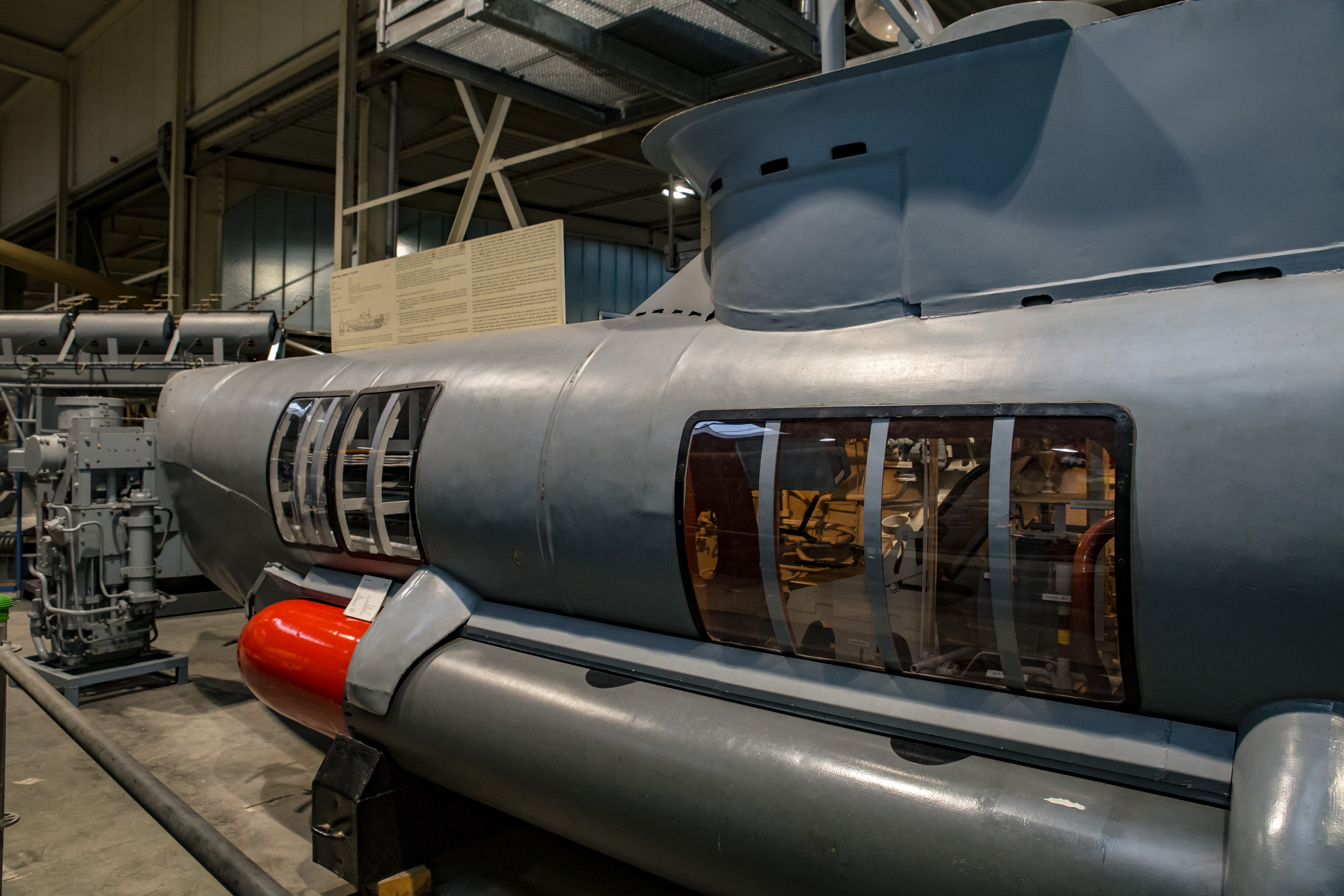
Cutaway of Seehund, Type XXVII, midget submarine.

== Publications and special exhibitions ==
Starting in 1987, the WTS published the book series "Wehrtechnik und wissenschaftliche Waffenkunde" (Defense Technology and Scientific Weaponry) on defense technology and technical-historical research topics of the WTS, initially by the publishing house E.S. Mittler in Herford, and most recently in 2012 by Bernard & Graefe in Bonn. In addition to the historians Arnold and Rolf Wirtgen, the mechanical engineer Wolfram Funk and historians Matthias Uhl and Hans-Dierk Fricke, among others, published in this series. Some of the publications can still be purchased at antiquarian booksellers.

Over the years, the Wehrtechnische Studiensammlung Koblenz has organized a number of special exhibitions to present specific areas of the collection.

== Public perception ==
Unlike the Bundeswehr Military History Museum, which presents the development of military in a historical-social context, the WTS focuses on technologies in defense engineering. Along with the German Tank Museum in Munster, the Army History Museum in Vienna, the Swiss Military Museum in Full, the Bovington Tank Museum, and the Tank Museum in Saumur, the WTS is one of the most important defense technology collections internationally, but unlike them, it covers the entire technological and historical breadth of defense technology.

In its reports from 2009 and 2015, the Federal Court of Audit accused the WTS of making the collection expendable. In particular, it was accused of operating the collection without a viable concept and in an uneconomic fashion . The criticism of the Federal Court of Audit led to an intensive consideration of the future of the WTS by decision-makers: on 12 July 2016, State Secretary Dr. Karin Suder decided in a table discussion with department heads in the BMVg in favor of a fundamental preservation of the collection and against a dissolution and liquidation. On 26 July. 2018, Vice Admiral Stawitzki, Head of the Equipment Department at the BMVg, visited the WTS and informeded himself about general conditions and future perspectives. On 28 March 2019, MdB Josef Oster, Member of the Bundestag in the constituency 199 Koblenz, visited the WTS to get an impression of the special conditions of the facility. In 2019, the WTS recorded 25,000 visitors, of which almost 9,000 were from the Bundeswehr.

In its January 2021 issue, the newspaper Loyal reported on the current status of the WTS and the position of the Federal Ministry of Defense in evaluating the collection as important in terms of its mission and wanting to maintain it in the future. The article also quotes military historian Sönke Neitzel: "We need this technical memory. Technical history is not taught in the museums of the Bundeswehr or at the universities of the Bundeswehr. Higher engineering expertise on historical-technical issues is only available at the WTS. As a historian, I need this technical perspective." In particular, the technical-historical reference of the collection is evaluated as important in order to be able to better classify historical contexts.

In the 2020 museum ranking of the website Testberichte.de, which ranked over 500 museums according to their popularity, the WTS achieved 34th place nationwide and second place in Rhineland-Palatinate.

== Future ==
In the discussion for a future design of the WTS, the necessary infrastructure, a sufficient personnel framework and the economic efficiency in operation play a role above all. For a long time, the relocation of the WTS with all its functions to the former Fritsch barracks in front of Ehrenbreitstein fortress was discussed in Koblenz. This was prepared in 2005. It was intended to be implemented by the time of the Bundesgartenschau (Federal Garden Show) in 2011. The project was ready for decision around 2008, but was not realized. The Federal Minister of Defense Jung visited the WTS on 1 July 2008, and announced that the collection would remain in Koblenz. In 2016, a transfer to the southern part of the Deines-Bruchmüller-Barracks in Lahnstein was discussed. This approach, which aimed to involve the city of Lahnstein in a private-law operator model, failed. An integration into the Military History Museum of the German Armed Forces in Dresden was not pursued. Instead, this museum institution of the Bundeswehr took over numerous exhibits to Dresden and affiliated sites. A temporarily favoured option was the consolidation of the WTS and its satellite camps on the grounds of the Metternich field office (Wasserplatz) of Wehrtechnische Dienststelle 41 in Koblenz-Metternich. This project option was tied to the termination of the interim use with office containers by the Federal Office of Bundeswehr Equipment, Information Technology and In-Service Support. Alternatively, the redevelopment of the site in the former Langemarck-Barracks was up for debate. A decision and resulting infrastructure measures were not announced until the end of 2021.

== Association of Friends and Sponsors of the Wehrtechnische Studiensammlung ==
The Association Friends and Sponsors of the Wehrtechnische Studiensammlung (Verein der Freunde und Förderer der Wehrtechnischen Studiensammlung e.V.-VFF WTS e.V.) supports the WTS. The personnel and financial resources provided by the service ensure the performance of the collection's service-related tasks within the Bundeswehr. In 1979, the Association of Friends and Sponsors of the Wehrtechnische Studiensammlung e.V. was founded to support public access in particular and to promote the necessary museum tasks of the WTS. Among the founding members are several high-ranking soldiers, members of the Federal Office of Defense Technology and Procurement, and defense technology companies. The chairmanship was initially held by the respective mayor of Koblenz. Currently, the association is chaired by Andreas Biebricher as 1st chairman, and Christian Leitzbach as 2nd chairman. The board's scientific advisor until 2023 was Rolf Hilmes, an expert renowned for the development of armor technology.

== See also ==
- Deutsches Panzermuseum – Munster, Germany
- Australian Armour and Artillery Museum – Australia
- Musée des Blindés – Saumur, France
- Nationaal Militair Museum – Soesterberg, The Netherlands
- United States Army Ordnance Museum
- Polish Army Museum – Warsaw, Poland

== Literature ==
- Hilmes, Rolf (2017), 1916–2016 "100 Jahre Panzer" : Betrachtungen zu Meilensteinen bei der Entwicklung der Panzerkonzepte und der Baugruppentechnologie (in German), Koblenz: VFFWTS, ISBN 978-3-9819293-0-0
- Wirtgen, Rolf; Köhler, Frank, eds. (2005), Exponate der Wehrtechnischen Studiensammlung: Präsentiert an den Tagen der offenen Tür bei der Wehrtechnischen Dienststelle (WTD 51) in Koblenz am 16. und 17. Juli 2005 und bei der 5. Koblenzer Museumsnacht am 3. September 2005 (in German) (2., korr. ed.), Koblenz: Bundesamt für Wehrtechnik und Beschaffung, ISBN 3-7648-1467-5
- Wirtgen, Rolf, ed. (1989), Uniformen in den NATO-Staaten 1900 bis heute (Uniforms in the NATO nations nineteen-hundred to date) (in German), Bonn, Herford: Bundesamt für Wehrtechnik und Beschaffung, ISBN 3-8132-0331-X
- Wirtgen, Rolf; Zimmer, Hubert, eds. (2005), Die Entwicklung des Maschinengewehrs : vom Handrohr zum Universal-Maschinengewehr; Broschüre zur Sonderausstellung 2005 bei der Wehrtechnischen Studiensammlung; (01.07. – 23.12.2005) / in Zusammenarbeit mit dem Waffenmuseum Suhl. (in German), Koblenz: Bundesamt für Wehrtechnik und Beschaffung, ISBN 3-927038-66-0
