= Hecht (submarine) =

Type of midget submarine

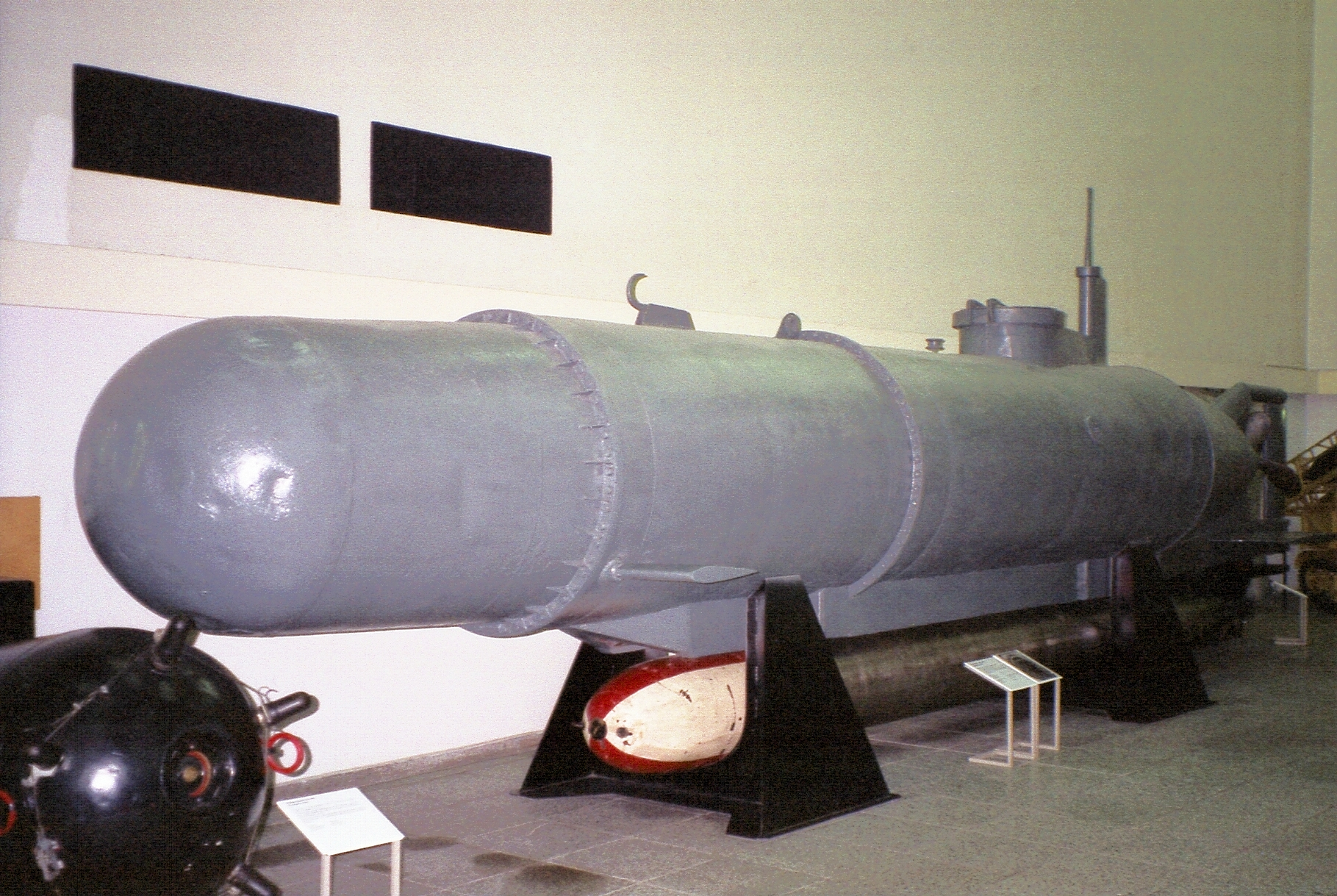
- Type XXVIIA (Hecht) midget submarine

Class overview
- Name: Hecht
- Builders: Germaniawerft, Kiel
- Operators: Kriegsmarine
- Built: May – August 1944
- Planned: 190
- Completed: 53

General characteristics
- Displacement: 12 long tons (12 t) submerged
- Length: 10.4 m (34 ft)
- Propulsion: 1 × 12 hp AEG electric torpedo motor
- Speed: 6 knots (11 km/h; 6.9 mph) submerged
- Range: 69 nmi (128 km; 79 mi) at 4 knots (7.4 km/h; 4.6 mph) submerged
- Complement: 2
- Armament: 1 G7e torpedo or 1 × mine; explosive charge in nose

Hecht (German: "Pike"), also known as Type XXVIIA, was a two-man all-electric German midget submarine created during World War II.

== History ==
The origin of the Hecht began with the salvage of the two British X class submarines HMS X6 and X7 which had been sunk during Operation Source, an attempt to sink the German battleship Tirpitz. Hauptamt Kriegschiffbau subsequently produced a design for a two-man submarine based on inspection of the British boats, designated Type XXVIIA and named Hecht ("Pike")

Like the British X class boats, the Type XXVIIA was designed to carry explosive charges to be laid beneath enemy ships, but it was markedly smaller and had substantial differences from the X class. It dispensed with a dual diesel/electric propulsion system, relying instead solely on electrical power in the form of a 12 hp AEG torpedo motor, on the basis that since it would operate submerged there was no need for a diesel engine. This resulted in a very low endurance of 69 nmi (128 km; 79 mi) at 4 knots (7.4 km/h; 4.6 mph).

Since the boat would need to be able to pass through anti-submarine nets and similar obstacles, it was designed without hydroplanes or fins, her trim being controlled with adjustable weights within the pressure hull. In practice this proved totally ineffective since the weights could not be moved quickly enough and hydroplanes and fins were subsequently fitted. Submerged control was still poor, since Hecht was not fitted with ballast tanks.

Even though Hecht had been designed to transport an explosive charge, Karl Dönitz insisted that a torpedo be carried so that attacks could be carried out on vessels in coastal waters and Hecht was designed to be armed either with an underslung torpedo or an underslung mine, and a limpet mine in the nose.

Externally, Hecht resembled the British Welman submarine. The detachable explosive charge was fitted to the nose of the submarine, while the forward section held the battery and a gyrocompass, the first to be fitted to a German midget submarine and considered essential for navigation since the craft was intended to operate almost exclusively below the surface. Behind this was the control compartment with seats for the two man crew arranged one behind the other on the centreline with the engineer in front and the commander behind him. The commander was provided with a periscope and a clear acrylic dome for navigational purposes.

On 18 January 1944, Dönitz discussed the new design with Adolf Hitler who expressed his approval, and on 9 March contracts were placed with Germaniawerft of Kiel for construction of a prototype, followed by a further contract for 52 submarines on 28 March.

A total of 53 Hechts were built between May and August 1944, but their unsatisfactory performance meant they never saw action, and were mostly used for training Seehund crews.

The submarine could also carry a diver in the nose rather than a magnetic mine.
