= Glückauf (1886 ship) =

Coordinates: 40°40′51.5″N 73°1′7.6″W

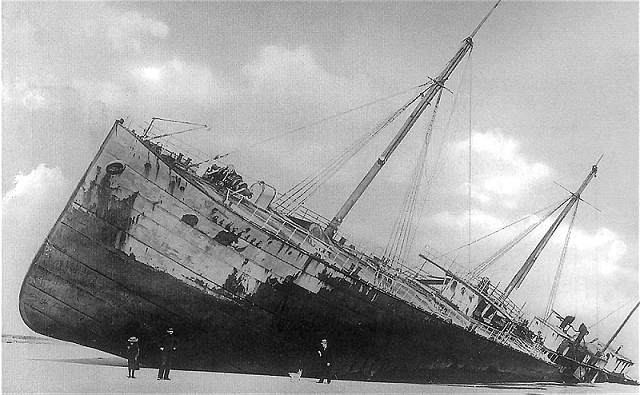
- Tourists standing near the Glückauf

History

Germany
- Name: Glückauf
- Namesake: "Good Luck"
- Owner: Heinrich Riedemann
- Operator: Heinrich Riedemann
- Port of registry: German
- Builder: Armstrong, Mitchell and Company, Newcastle upon Tyne
- Yard number: 473
- Laid down: 25 November 1885
- Launched: 16 June 1886
- Maiden voyage: 10 July 1886
- Out of service: 24 March 1893
- Identification: Code letters: KRBH
- Fate: Wrecked, 25 March 1893

General characteristics
- Type: Oil tanker
- Tonnage: 2,307 GRT; 1,687 NRT
- Length: 300 ft 6 in (91.59 m) o/a
- Beam: 37 ft 2 in (11.33 m)
- Depth: 23 ft 3 in (7.09 m)
- Propulsion: 1 × 3-cylinder Wallsend Slipway & Engineering Company triple expansion steam engine, 200 nhp, 1 shaft
- Speed: 10.5 knots (19.4 km/h; 12.1 mph)

Glückauf was a German ship that represented a major step forward in oil tanker design. "When the Glückauf sailed from the Tyne on 10 July 1886 she was the first ocean going tanker with oil to her skin". The vessel was in use from 1886 to 25 March 1893, when it ran aground at Fire Island in New York.

The 2700-ton tanker was built at the Armstrong Mitchell yard, Walker, Newcastle upon Tyne, Britain, with eight compartments for the cargo. It was the first ship in which oil could be pumped directly into the vessel hull instead of being loaded in barrels or drums. (Other sources give the gross tonnage in the 2300s.)

It was built for Wilhelm Anton Riedemann's shipping firm in Geestemünde and ran mostly as a tramp steamer.

Glückauf was on a charter voyage for the Standard Oil Company when it ran aground across from Sayville, New York at Blue Point Beach on Fire Island along Long Island. Differing sources give the date of the wreck as March 23, 24, or 25, in 1892 or 1893; a contemporary New York Times article said that it ran aground "just before dawn" on March 24, 1893. Men from the Blue Point Life-Saving Station rescued the crew. On April 7, it was briefly dislodged and was being pulled out to sea when the hawser broke; the ship ran permanently aground.

The wreck quickly became a tourist attraction, and scavengers ripped up whatever they could and carried it away.

The wreck of the Glückauf now lies 75–100 feet (23–30 m) offshore, from the water surface to 25 feet (7.6 m) of water.
