= Glück auf =

German miners' greeting phrase

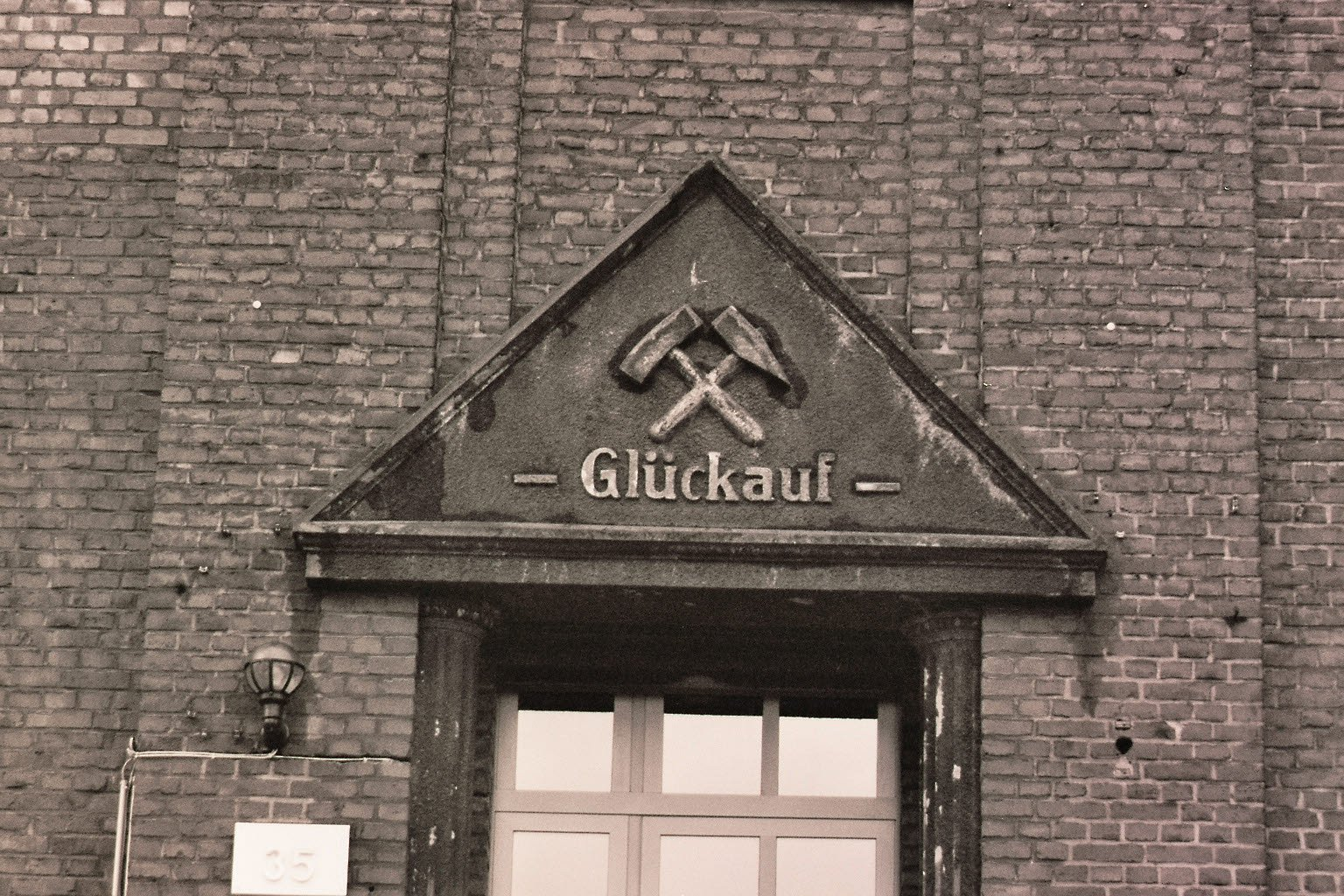
Miners' greeting Glückauf with hammer and pick symbol above the entrance of an old mine building in the southern Ruhr

Glück Auf: motto in the coat of arms of the mining town of Tsumeb, Namibia

Glückauf (alternative spelling Glück auf; also, as an exclamation: Glück auf!) is the traditional German miners' greeting. It describes the hope of the miners: "es mögen sich Erzgänge auftun" ("may lodes [of ore] be opened") which is short for "Ich wünsche Dir Glück, tu einen neuen Gang auf" ("I wish you luck, open a new lode"), because, when mining for ore, without prospecting, no-one could predict with certainty whether the miners' work would lead to a reward. The greeting also expressed the desire that miners would return safely from the mine after their shift.

Today it is still a common form of greeting in the Ore Mountains region of eastern Germany and in the Ruhr area, specifically Bochum, which is home to the German Mining Museum (Deutsches Bergbau-Museum).

== Emergence ==
The greeting emerged in the Saxon Ore Mountains towards the end of the 16th century, when the miners still entered and left the mines on foot using ladders (Fahrten) or man engines (Fahrkunst). That meant that, after a typical 10-hour shift, the miner often had a challenging and dangerous 2 hours of climbing ahead of him, something that they believed needed a degree of luck to negotiate safely. If he slipped (fahrtlos), he fell down the shaft. The result was that at that time (16th to 18th centuries) fatal accidents were very common, and not just when entering or leaving the mine. It was often the case that friends on the next shift, who had been greeted on the way out, were left in the mine.

== Historical usage ==
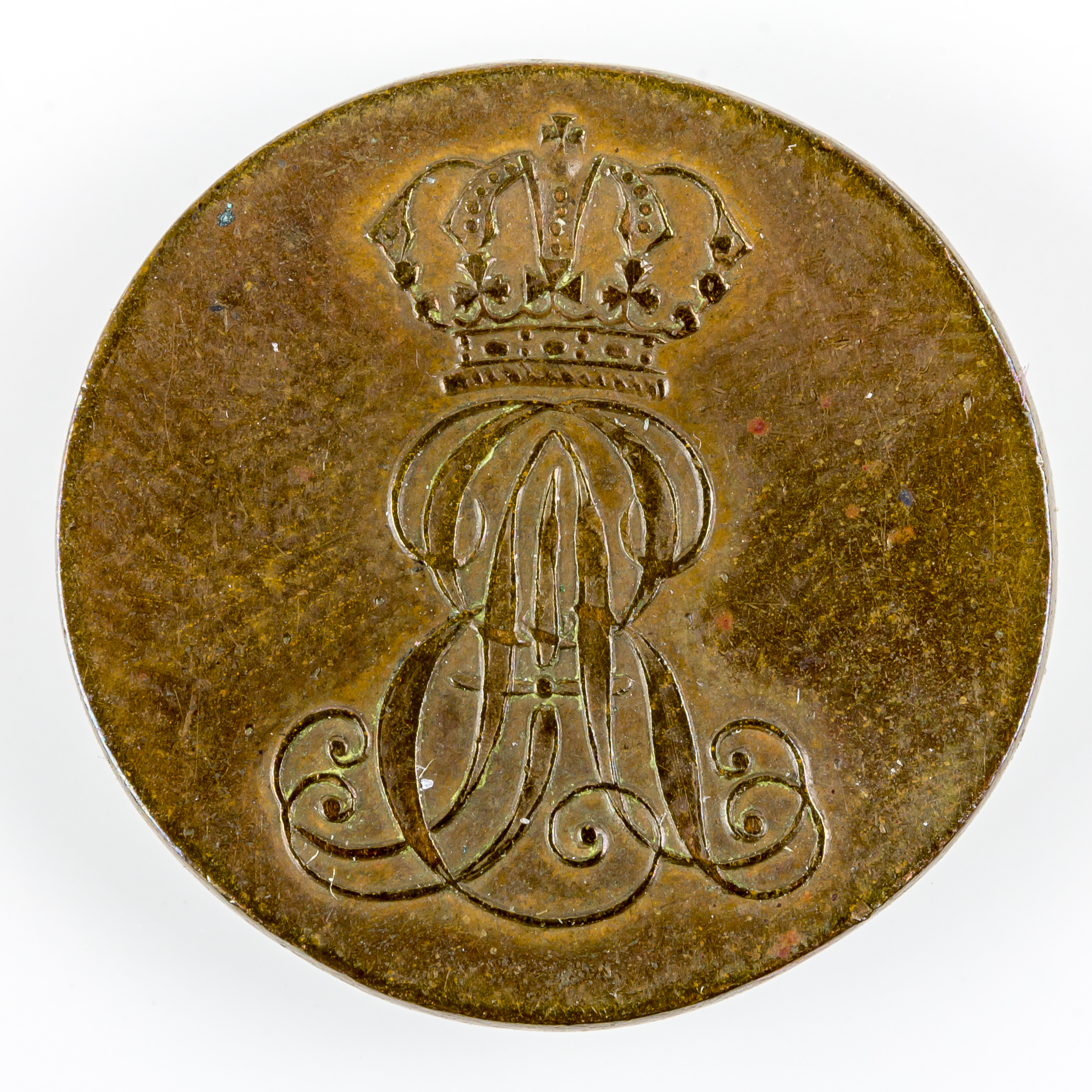
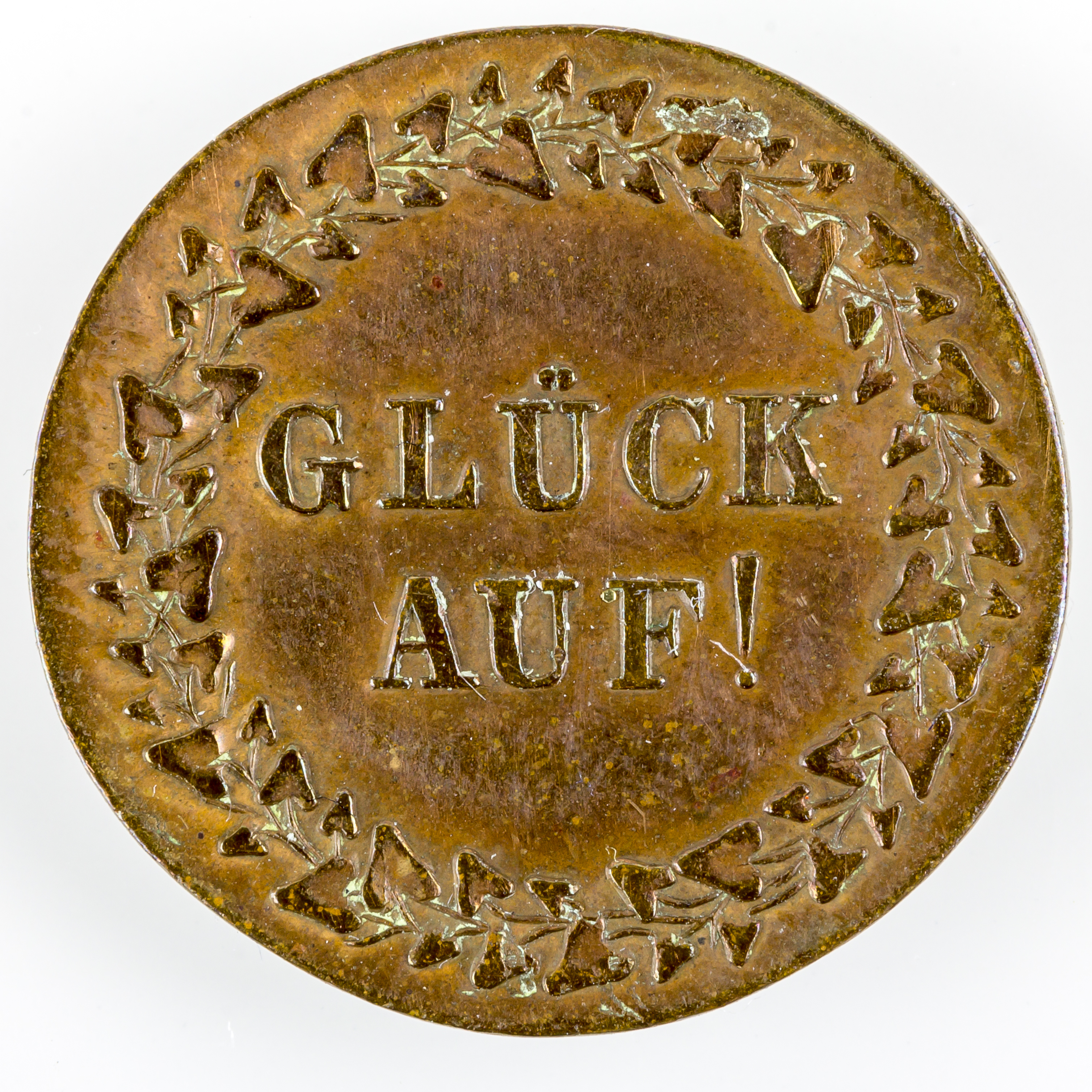
1 Pfennig, Kingdom of Hanover, struck 1839 to commemorate King Ernest Augustus' visit to the Clausthal mint

The miner's greeting was already being used before 1700, being artistically employed in the old miner's song Glück Auf, der Steiger kommt; it thus became part of the folksong repertoire.

Mines were also named after the greeting, such as the Zeche Glückauf-Tiefbau, Zeche Glückauf Barmen or Zeche Glückaufsegen.

By 1890 at the latest the greeting was widespread among German-speaking speleologists (cave explorers) and is still the most common form of greeting in that community today. It is particularly commonly used when entering the cave.

The phrase was introduced by German miners in the mines in Dutch Limburg, and was adopted by the Dutch miners.

== Related terms ==
- In air travel the corresponding greeting, Glück ab!, is used in German. This is today the official greeting of German-speaking parachutists and also the official battle cry of the airmobile forces of the German Bundeswehr.
- Glück zu! is the traditional greeting of millers in German-speaking lands.
- Glück tief! is a derived, but only regional greeting used by cavers.

== Student culture ==
With the emergence of student culture in the 1800s, student associations linked to mining related fields of study incorporated the 'Glück Auf' greeting as part of their identity. Most notable was the 'Mijnbouwkundige vereeniging' from the Delft University of Technology.

== See also ==
- Glückauf (1886)
- Ingenieurbüro Glückauf
