= Seehund =

Type of midget submarine

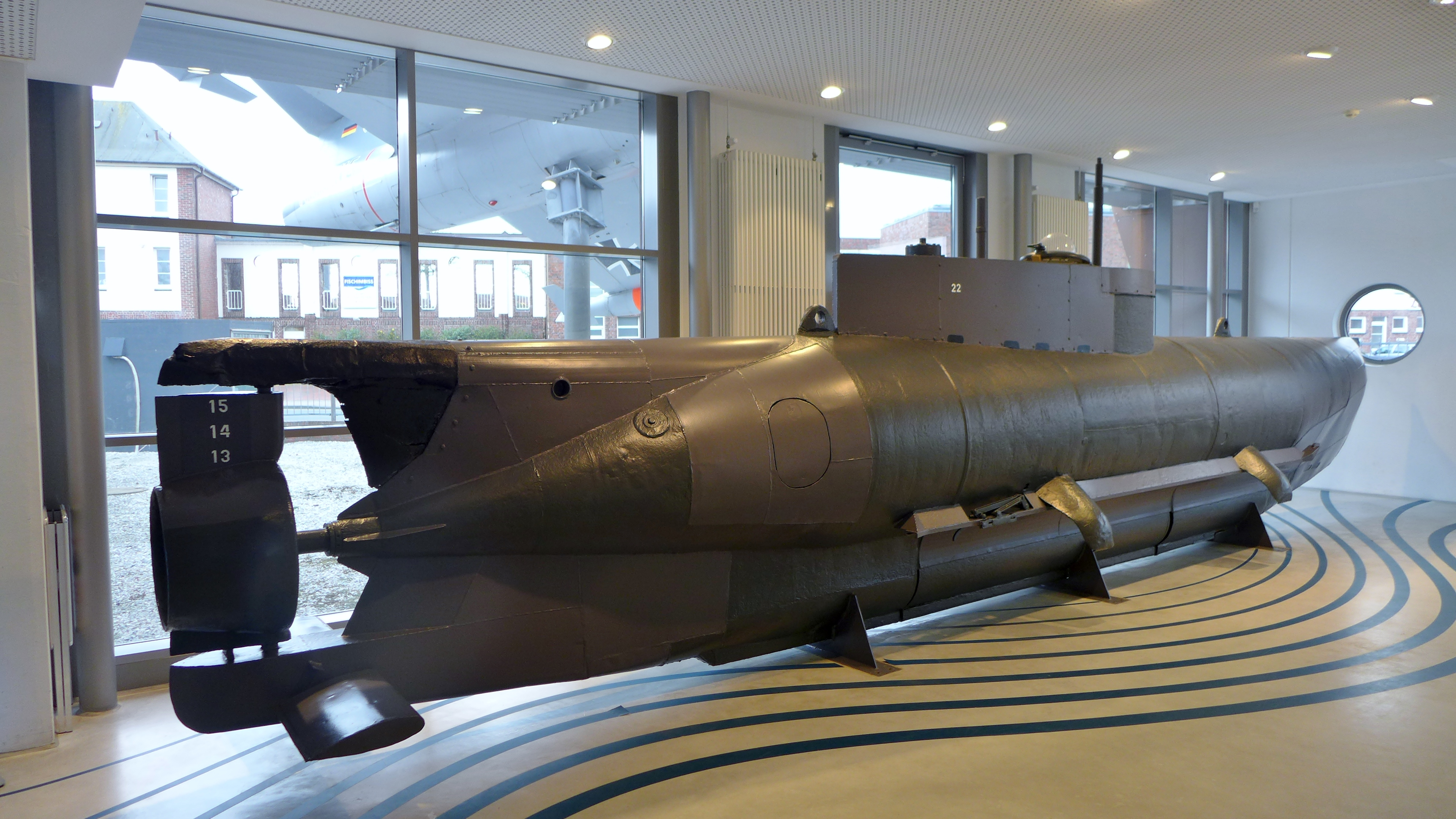
- A Seehund midget submarine, on display at the Deutsches Marinemuseum, Wilhelmshaven, Lower Saxony, Germany

Class overview
- Name: Seehund
- Builders: Germaniawerft, Kiel
- Operators: Kriegsmarine; French Navy
- Built: 1944–1945
- In commission: 1944–1953
- Planned: 1,000
- Completed: 285
- Active: 138
- Lost: 35

General characteristics
- Type: Midget submarine
- Displacement: 17 long tons (17 t) (submerged)
- Length: 12 m (39 ft 4 in)
- Beam: 1.5 m (4 ft 11 in)
- Propulsion: 1 × 60 bhp (45 kW) Büssing diesel engine; 25 bhp (19 kW) AEG electric motor
- Speed: 7 knots (13 km/h; 8.1 mph) (surfaced); 6 knots (11 km/h; 6.9 mph) (submerged)
- Range: 270 nmi (500 km; 310 mi) at 7 knots (13 km/h; 8.1 mph) (surfaced); 63 nmi (117 km; 72 mi) at 4 knots (7.4 km/h; 4.6 mph) (submerged)
- Complement: 2
- Armament: 2 × G7e(TIIIc) torpedoes

Seehund (German: "seal"), also known as Type XXVII, was a midget submarine built by Nazi Germany during World War II. Designed in 1944 and operated by two-man crews, it was used by the Kriegsmarine (German Navy) during the closing months of the war, sinking nine merchant vessels and damaging an additional three, while losing 35 boats, mostly attributed to bad weather. The French Navy used four captured boats after the war until 1953.

== History ==
The origin of the Seehund began with the salvage of the two British X class submarines HMS X6 and X7 which had been lost by the Royal Navy during Operation Source, an attempt to sink the German battleship Tirpitz. Hauptamt Kriegschiffbau subsequently produced a design for a two-man submarine based on inspection of the British boats, designated Type XXVIIA and named Hecht ("Pike").

=== XXVIIA (Hecht) ===
Like the British X class boats, the Type XXVIIA was designed to carry explosive charges to be laid beneath enemy ships, but it was markedly smaller and had substantial differences from the X class. It dispensed with a dual diesel/electric propulsion system, relying instead solely on electrical power in the form of a 12-brake-horsepower (8.9 kW) AEG torpedo motor, on the basis that since it would operate submerged there was no need for a diesel engine. However, this resulted in a very low endurance of 69 nautical miles (128 km; 79 mi) at 4 knots (7.4 km/h; 4.6 mph).

Since the boat would need to be able to pass through anti-submarine nets and similar obstacles, it was designed without hydroplanes or fins, her trim being controlled with adjustable weights within the pressure hull. In practice this proved totally ineffective since the weights could not be moved quickly enough, and hydroplanes and fins were subsequently fitted. Submerged control was still poor, since Hecht was not fitted with ballast tanks.

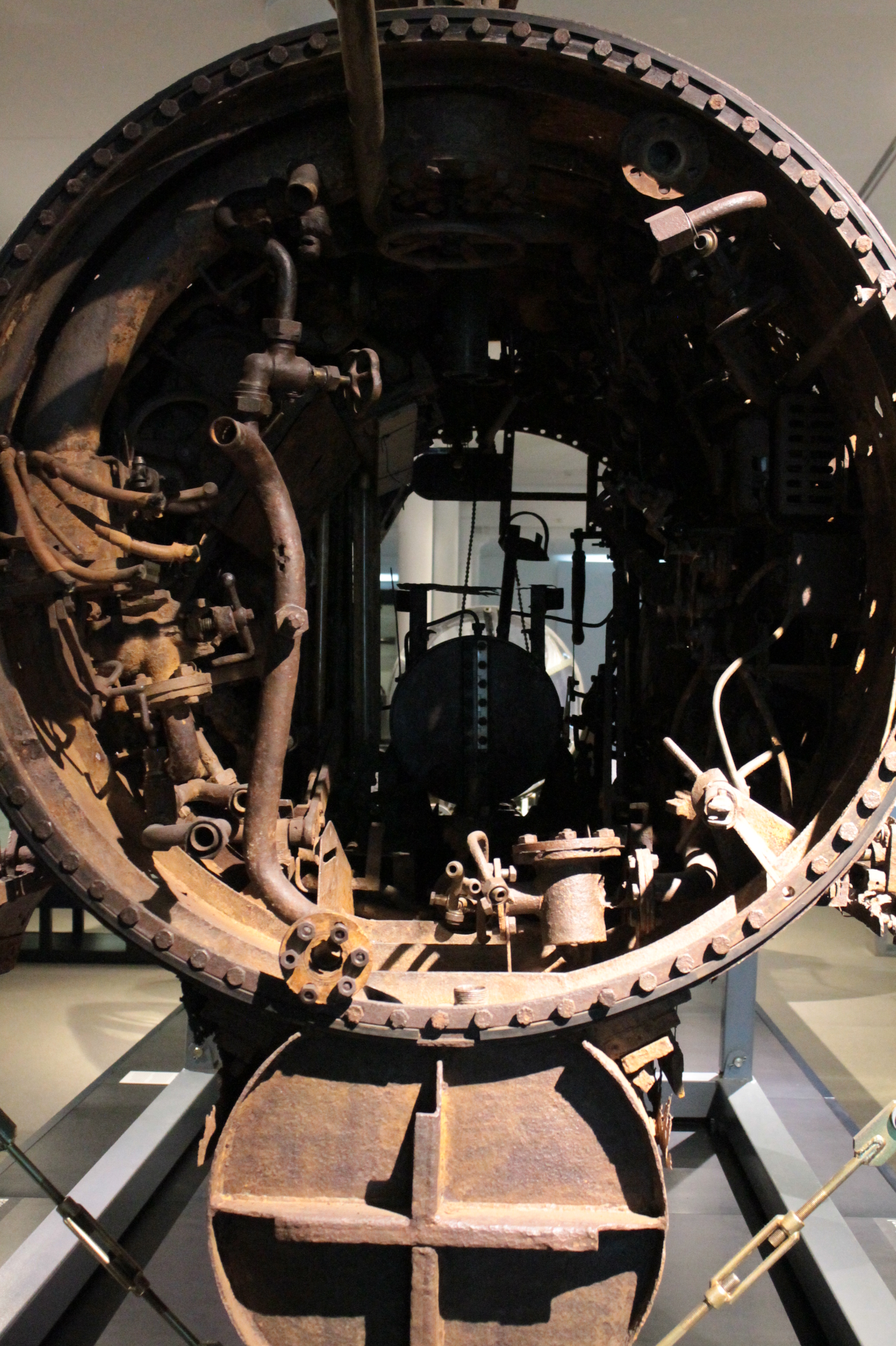
Interior of a salvaged Seehund submarine, Bundeswehr Military History Museum, Dresden

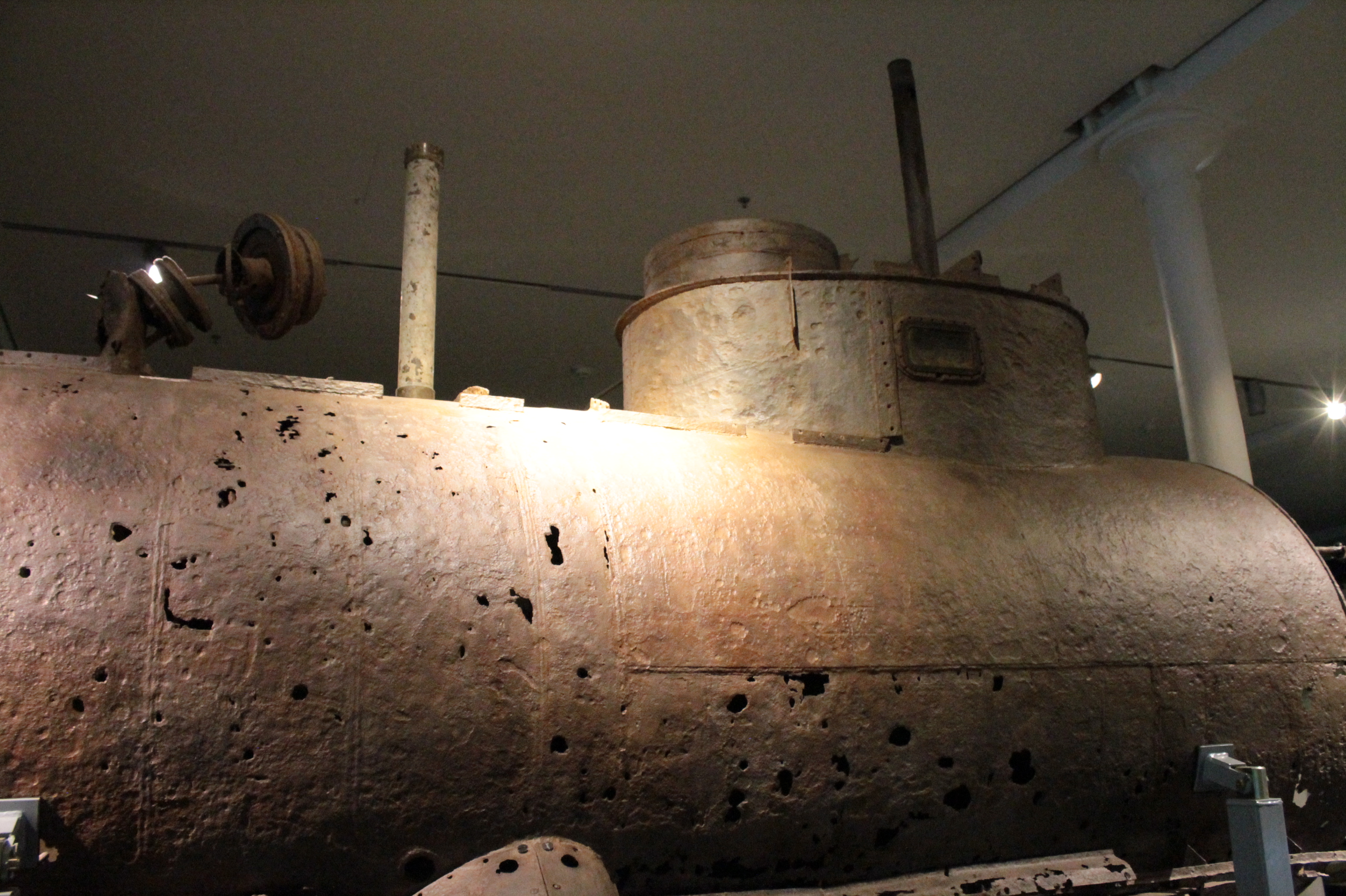
Salvaged Seehund submarine, Bundeswehr Military History Museum, Dresden

Even though Hecht had been designed to transport an explosive charge, Karl Dönitz insisted that a torpedo be carried so that attacks could be carried out on vessels in coastal waters.

Externally, Hecht resembled the British Welman submarine. The detachable explosive charge was fitted to the nose of the submarine, while the forward section held the battery and a gyrocompass, the first to be fitted to a German midget submarine and considered essential for navigation if the craft was to operate submerged. Behind this was the control compartment with seats for the two-man crew arranged one behind the other on the centerline with the engineer in front and the commander behind him. The commander was provided with a periscope and a clear acrylic dome for navigational purposes.

On 18 January 1944, Dönitz discussed the new design with Adolf Hitler who expressed his approval, and on 9 March contracts were placed with Germaniawerft of Kiel for construction of a prototype, followed by a further contract for 52 submarines on 28 March.

The 53 Hechts were constructed between May and August 1944: in the event, none saw active service but were instead used to train Seehund crews.

=== Type XXVIIB ===
As the orders were being placed, Hecht variants were under construction. The first was the Type XXVIIB, which had a greater range, could carry two G7e(TIIIc) torpedoes, and had diesel/electric propulsion. The design was completed at the end of June 1944 and resembled Hecht but had a better boat-shaped external casing for improved seakeeping while surfaced, and saddle tanks. Additional room had been made inside the pressure hull by moving the batteries to the keel, while the two torpedoes were mounted externally in recesses in the lower hull. A 22-brake-horsepower (16 kW) diesel engine was fitted for surface use and was estimated to give a surfaced speed of 5.5 knots (10.2 km/h; 6.3 mph), with a 25-brake-horsepower (19 kW) electric motor providing a submerged speed of 6.9 knots (12.8 km/h; 7.9 mph).

The final variant of the Type XXVII was the Type XXVIIB5, better known as the Seehund ("Seal") or Type 27. Seehund had a small sail midships with the air-intake mast, magnetic compass, periscope, and a clear dome which could survive depths of 45 meters (148 ft). The submarine's fixed 3-meter (9.8 ft) periscope incorporated lenses which let the commander check the sky above for aircraft before surfacing.

== Production ==
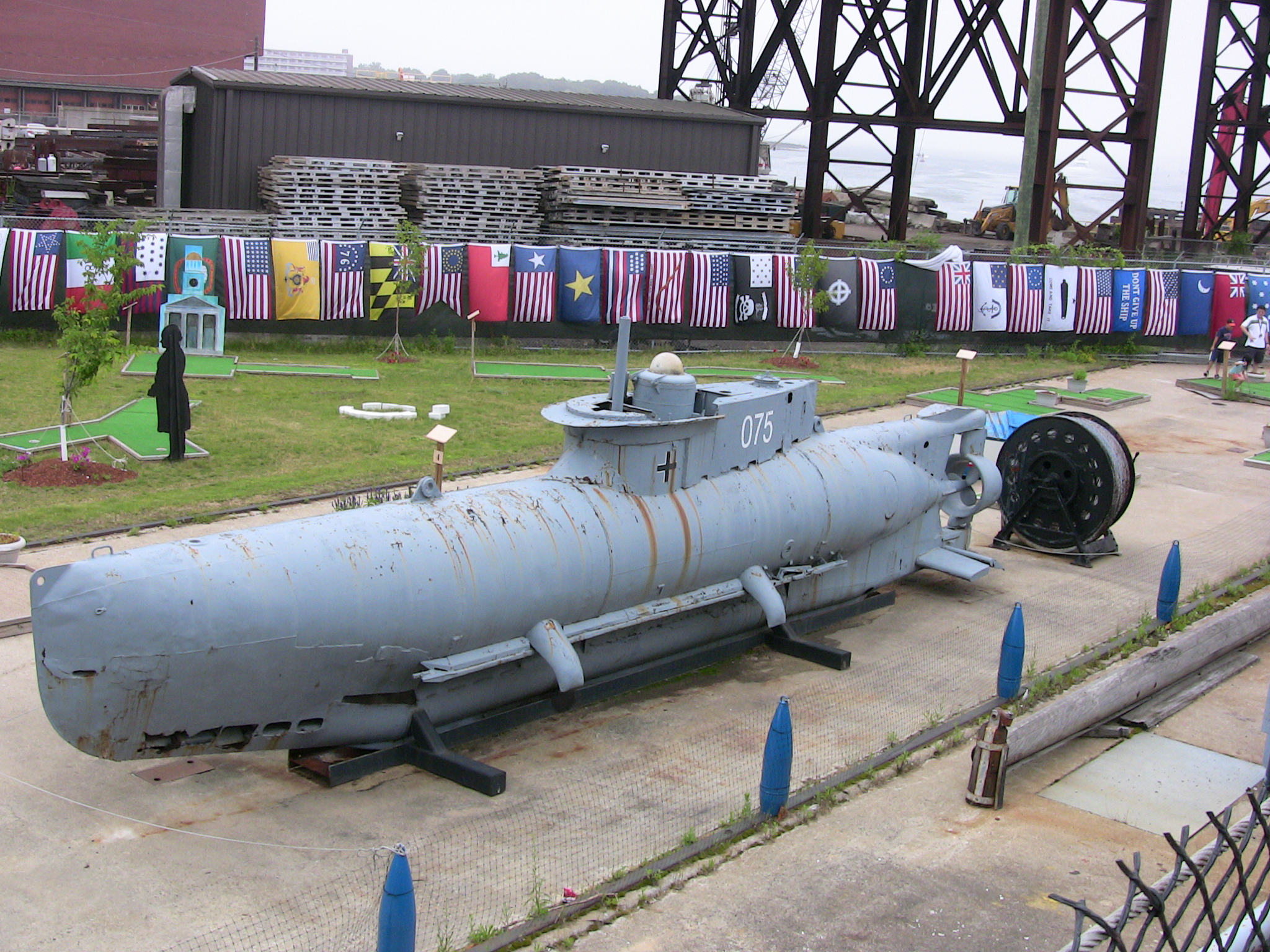
Seehund 075 at the United States Naval Shipbuilding Museum

The first contract for Seehund construction was placed on 30 July 1944, before the design was completed. A total of 1,000 boats were ordered, of which Germaniawerft and Schichau-Werke were to build 25 and 45 boats per month respectively. Other shipyards that were intended to participate in Seehund production were Cantieri Riuniti dell'Adriatico at Monfalcone, Italy, and Klöckner-Humboldt-Deutz at Ulm. However, Dönitz would not consent to the production of the Type XXIII submarine being held up for Seehund construction, while shortages of raw material, labor and transport problems, and conflicting priorities in Germany's economy all combined to reduce Seehund production. In the end Seehund production was undertaken by Germaniawerft at Kiel in the Konrad bunker which was no longer needed for production of Type XXI or Type XXIII submarines. A total of 285 Seehunds were constructed and allocated numbers in the range U-5001 to U-6442.

== Operational service ==
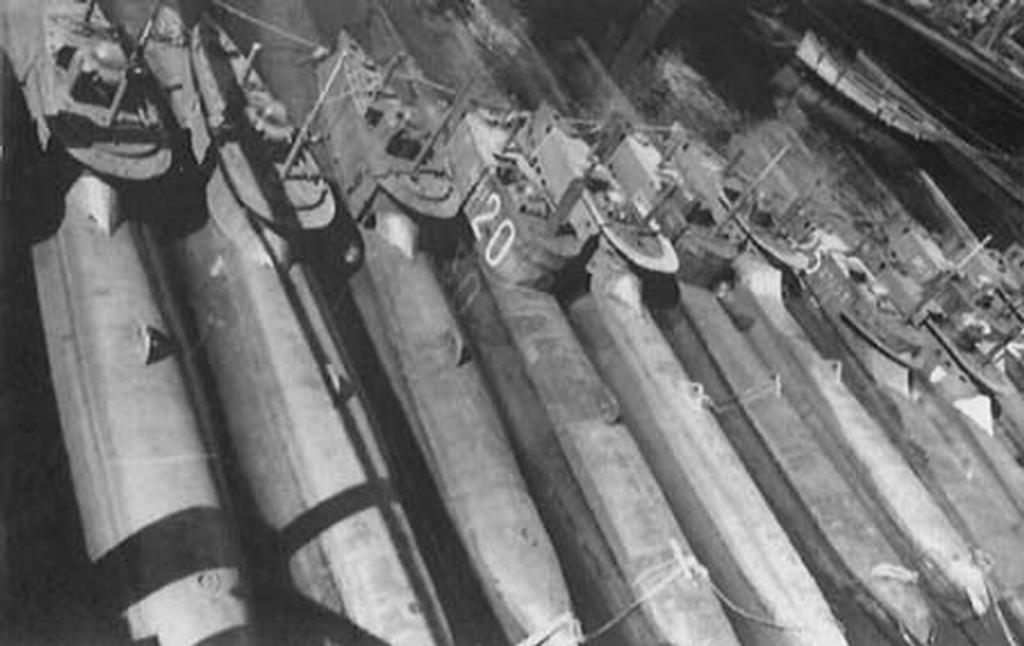
Captured Seehund submarines, 1945

The first Seehund operation took place on 31 December 1944, when 18 craft set out from IJmuiden in the Netherlands. However, this was a disaster – the submarines encountered a storm and only two returned. The first sinking by a Seehund did not occur until February 1945, when a freighter was sunk off Great Yarmouth.

Seehunds operated mainly around the German coast and in the English Channel, and could attack on the surface in turbulent weather, but had to be almost stationary for submerged attacks. From January to April 1945 Seehunds performed 142 sorties, and accounted for about 93,000 gross tons of shipping (British sources estimate 120,000 tons). Administratively, the Seehunds were under the command of Lehrkommandos, which were part of the German Navy's special operations branch. Within each Lehrkommando were subordinate K-Flotilla; K-Flottille 311 was specifically designated to oversee deployment of the Hecht miniature submarine while the Seehund submarines were dispersed between K-Flottille 312, 313, and 314.

From the Allied point of view, the Seehund's small size made it almost impossible for Asdic to get a return from her hull, while her very quiet slow-speed running made her almost immune to detection by hydrophone. As Admiral Sir Charles Little, Commander-in-Chief, Portsmouth, put it, "Fortunately for us these damn things arrived too late in the war to do any damage".

The last Seehund sorties took place on 28 April and 2 May 1945, when two special missions were performed to resupply the besieged German garrison at Dunkirk with rations. The boats carried special food containers (nicknamed "butter torpedoes") instead of torpedoes, and on the return voyage used the containers to carry mail from the Dunkirk garrison.

The French navy received four units as war reparations, and commissioned them as S 621, S 622, S 623 and S624. They were used until August 1953.

== Survivors ==
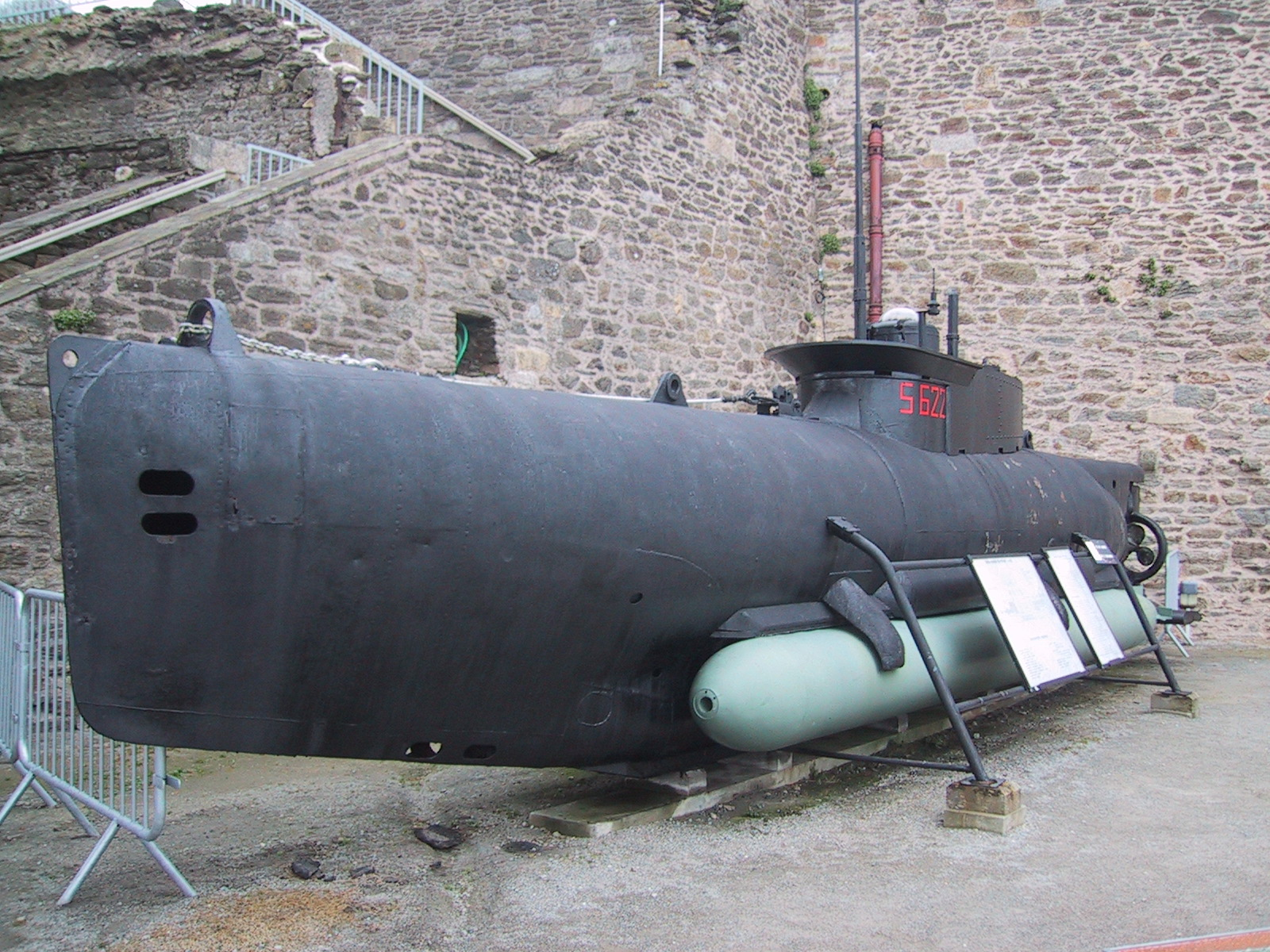
U-S622, at the Musée national de la Marine, Brest, France (2004)

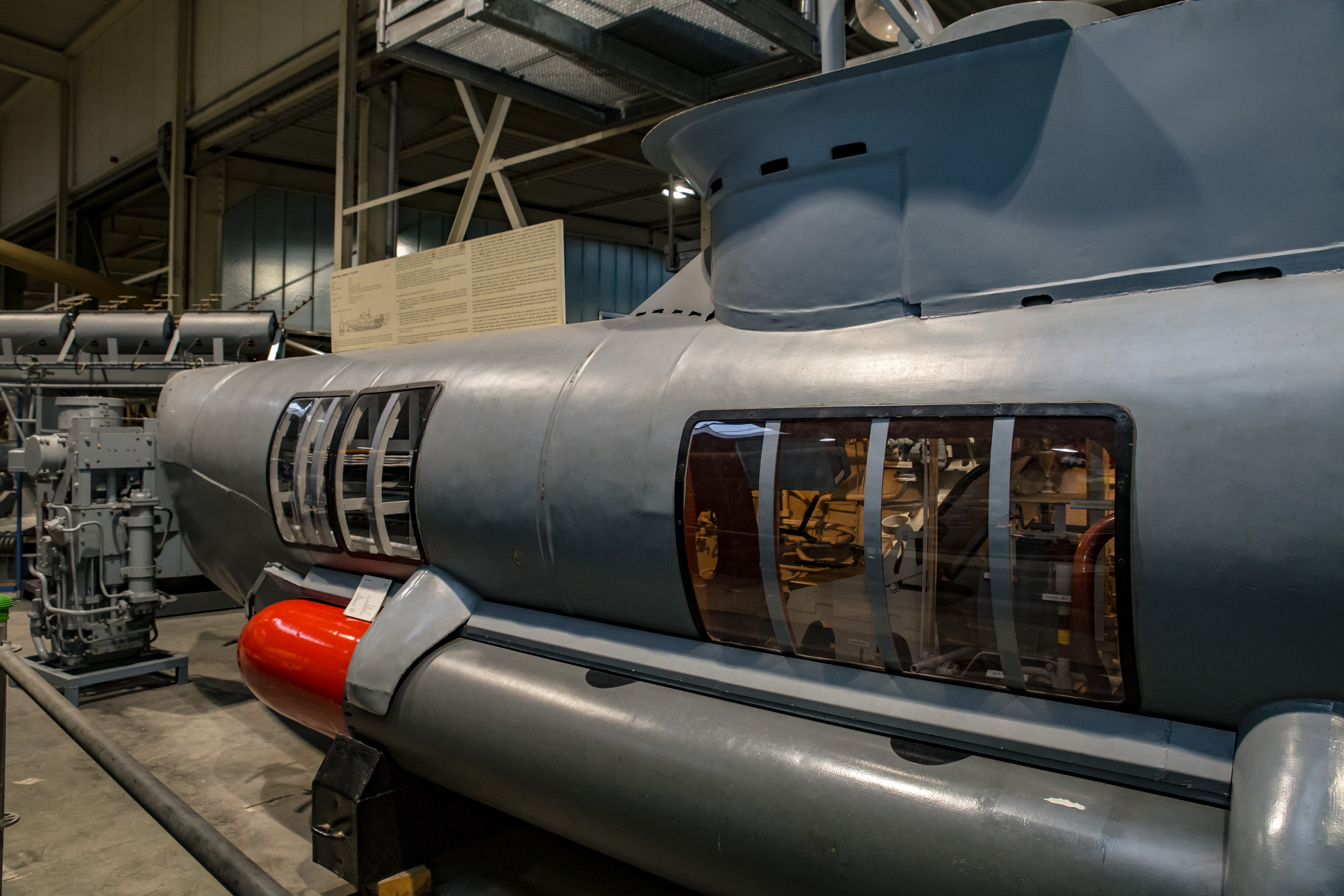
Cutaway of Seehund, at the Bundeswehr Museum of German Defense Technology, Koblenz, Germany

One of the boats used by the French navy post-war, U-5622, is preserved and on display at the Musée national de la Marine in Brest, France.

U-5075 is on display at the United States Naval Shipbuilding Museum, part of the Massachusetts Military Research Center, in Quincy, Massachusetts. Occasional amateur radio events are conducted by this museum ship, using the callsign WW2MAN. A replica Seehund is displayed onboard the SS American Victory in Tampa, Florida.

In Germany, Seehunds are displayed at several museums, the Technik Museum Speyer, the Deutsches Museum, Munich, the Marinemuseum Wilhelmshaven and the German Maritime Museum (Deutsches Schiffahrtsmuseum), Bremerhaven, and Curioseum Willingen (which has been test operated by the owners in a local lake). A cutaway of a Seehund is in the exhibition of the Bundeswehr Museum of German Defense Technology located in Koblenz.

In April 2002 the wreck of U-5095 was recovered by the Royal Dutch Navy and a civilian salvage team lying buried beneath a beach at Egmond aan Zee in the Netherlands, after having been run aground there by its crew in February 1945, and the remains are now on display at the IJmuiden bunker museum. Its two onboard torpedoes were found to be still active and their warheads were separated from their delivery systems and control-detonated at sea.
