= German submarine U-2342 =

German World War II submarine

Coordinates: 54°01′N 14°20′E

- Postwar photo of Hecht (S 171), (former Type XXIII submarine U-2367). An identical sister ship of U-2342.

History

Nazi Germany
- Name: U-2342
- Ordered: 20 September 1943
- Builder: Deutsche Werft, Hamburg
- Yard number: 496
- Laid down: 29 August 1944
- Launched: 13 October 1944
- Commissioned: 1 November 1944
- Fate: Sunk by mine on 26 December 1944

General characteristics
- Class & type: Type XXIII submarine
- Displacement: 234 t (230 long tons) surfaced; 258 t (254 long tons) submerged
- Length: 34.68 m (113 ft 9 in)
- Beam: 3.02 m (9 ft 11 in)
- Draft: 3.66 m (12 ft)
- Propulsion: 1 × MWM RS134S 6-cylinder diesel engine, 575–630 metric horsepower (423–463 kW; 567–621 shp); 1 × AEG GU4463-8 double-acting electric motor, 580 metric horsepower (427 kW; 572 shp); 1 × BBC CCR188 electric creeping motor, 35 metric horsepower (26 kW; 35 shp)
- Speed: 9.7 knots (18 km/h; 11 mph) surfaced; 12.5 knots (23 km/h; 14 mph) submerged
- Range: 2,600 nmi (4,800 km; 3,000 mi) at 8 knots (15 km/h; 9.2 mph) surfaced; 194 nmi (359 km; 223 mi) at 4 knots (7.4 km/h; 4.6 mph) submerged
- Test depth: 180 m (590 ft)
- Complement: 14–18
- Armament: 2 bow torpedo tubes; 2 torpedoes

Service record
- Part of: 32nd U-boat Flotilla; 1 November – 26 December 1944
- Identification codes: M 45 175
- Commanders: Oblt.z.S.d.R. Berthold Schad von Mittelbiberach; 1 November – 26 December 1944
- Operations: None
- Victories: None

German submarine U-2342 was a short-lived Type XXIII U-boat of Nazi Germany's Kriegsmarine during the Second World War. She was built at Hamburg during 1944 as a modern Type XXIII "Elektroboote", a small coastal class designed to strike ships along the coastlines of Britain and liberated Europe, particularly the English Channel, although none ever served there. U-2342 was placed under the command of Oberleutnant zur See der Reserve Berthold Schad von Mittelbiberach, a former senior non-commissioned officer, who received a field promotion in 1943. She was his first submarine experience.

== Design ==
Like all Type XXIII U-boats, U-2342 had a displacement of 234 tonnes (230 long tons) when at the surface and 258 tonnes (254 long tons) while submerged. She had a total length of 34.68 m (113 ft 9 in) (o/a), a beam width of 3.02 m (9 ft 11 in) (o/a), and a draught depth of3.66 m (12 ft). The submarine was powered by one MWM six-cylinder RS134S diesel engine providing 575–630 metric horsepower (423–463 kilowatts; 567–621 shaft horsepower), one AEG GU4463-8 double-acting electric motor electric motor providing 580 PS (430 kW; 570 shp), and one BBC silent running CCR188 electric motor providing 35 PS (26 kW; 35 shp).

The submarine had a maximum surface speed of 9.7 knots (18.0 km/h; 11.2 mph) and a submerged speed of 12.5 knots (23.2 km/h; 14.4 mph). When submerged, the boat could operate at 4 knots (7.4 km/h; 4.6 mph) for 194 nautical miles (359 km; 223 mi); when surfaced, she could travel 2,600 nautical miles (4,800 km; 3,000 mi) at 8 knots (15 km/h; 9.2 mph). U-2342 was fitted with two 53.3 cm (21 in) torpedo tubes in the bow. She could carry two preloaded torpedoes. The complement was 14–18 men. This class of U-boat did not carry a deck gun.

== Service history ==
The fate of U-2342 was not unusual, as the seas around the German coastline were subject to very heavy allied air attack during the final two years of the war, with the Royal Air Force seeking to restrict German movement by sowing thousands of air-dropped naval mines. This tactic delayed the production and training of new boats and disrupted coastal shipping. It also wrecked a number of new boats, including U-2342, before they had a chance to enter the Battle of the Atlantic.

U-2342 was travelling in a convoy of ten boats taking essential supplies and personnel to Norway on Boxing Day 1944. The operation was highly secret, and submarines were used to disguise it from any prying reconnaissance aircraft. Whilst just north of Swinemünde, U-2342 activated an air-dropped mine and fell out of the convoy, slowly sinking as the other boats carried on their passage northwards. Rescue vessels found some of the crew, but seven sailors, including the boat's captain were not found, lost in the explosion.

Demolition experts blew up the wreck in 1954 to clear the seaway, and parts were taken to shore, where they were broken up for scrap.

== Bibliography ==
- Busch, Rainer; Röll, Hans-Joachim (1999). German U-boat commanders of World War II: a biographical dictionary. Translated by Brooks, Geoffrey. London, Annapolis, Md: Greenhill Books, Naval Institute Press. ISBN 1-55750-186-6.
- Busch, Rainer; Röll, Hans-Joachim (1999). Deutsche U-Boot-Verluste von September 1939 bis Mai 1945 [German U-boat losses from September 1939 to May 1945]. Der U-Boot-Krieg (in German). Vol. IV. Hamburg, Berlin, Bonn: Mittler. ISBN 3-8132-0514-2.
- Gröner, Erich; Jung, Dieter; Maass, Martin (1991). U-boats and Mine Warfare Vessels. German Warships 1815–1945. Vol. 2. Translated by Thomas, Keith; Magowan, Rachel. London: Conway Maritime Press. ISBN 0-85177-593-4.
- Sharpe, Peter (1998). U-Boat Fact File. Great Britain: Midland Publishing. ISBN 1-85780-072-9.
