= German submarine U-2323 =

German World War II submarine

Coordinates: 54°23′N 10°11′E

- Postwar photo of Hecht (S 171), (former Type XXIII submarine U-2367). An identical sister ship of U-2323.

History

Nazi Germany
- Name: U-2323
- Ordered: 20 September 1943
- Builder: Deutsche Werft, Hamburg
- Yard number: 477
- Laid down: 11 April 1944
- Launched: 31 May 1944
- Commissioned: 18 July 1944
- Fate: Sunk on 26 July 1944

General characteristics
- Class & type: Type XXIII submarine
- Displacement: 234 t (230 long tons) surfaced; 258 t (254 long tons) submerged
- Length: 34.68 m (113 ft 9 in)
- Beam: 3.02 m (9 ft 11 in)
- Draft: 3.66 m (12 ft)
- Propulsion: 1 × MWM RS134S 6-cylinder diesel engine, 575–630 metric horsepower (423–463 kW; 567–621 shp); 1 × AEG GU4463-8 double-acting electric motor, 580 metric horsepower (427 kW; 572 shp); 1 × BBC CCR188 electric creeping motor, 35 metric horsepower (26 kW; 35 shp)
- Speed: 9.7 knots (18 km/h; 11 mph) surfaced; 12.5 knots (23 km/h; 14 mph) submerged
- Range: 2,600 nmi (4,800 km; 3,000 mi) at 8 knots (15 km/h; 9.2 mph) surfaced; 194 nmi (359 km; 223 mi) at 4 knots (7.4 km/h; 4.6 mph) submerged
- Test depth: 180 m (590 ft)
- Complement: 14–18
- Armament: 2 bow torpedo tubes; 2 torpedoes

Service record
- Part of: 4th U-boat Flotilla; 18 – 26 July 1944
- Identification codes: M 41 284
- Commanders: Lt.z.S. Walter Angermann; 18 – 26 July 1944
- Operations: None
- Victories: None

German submarine U-2323 was a Type XXIII submarine of Nazi Germany's Kriegsmarine during World War II. She was constructed at Hamburg during the spring of 1944, completed on the 18 July and given to Leutnant zur See Walter Angermann to command. A fast high-technology coastal boat, U-2323 was expected to be the new war-winning weapon in the Kriegsmarine's arsenal.

== Design ==
Like all Type XXIII U-boats, U-2323 had a displacement of 234 tonnes (230 long tons) when at the surface and 258 tonnes (254 long tons) while submerged. She had a total length of 34.68 m (113 ft 9 in) (o/a), a beam width of 3.02 m (9 ft 11 in) (o/a), and a draught depth of3.66 m (12 ft). The submarine was powered by one MWM six-cylinder RS134S diesel engine providing 575–630 metric horsepower (423–463 kilowatts; 567–621 shaft horsepower), one AEG GU4463-8 double-acting electric motor electric motor providing 580 PS (430 kW; 570 shp), and one BBC silent running CCR188 electric motor providing 35 PS (26 kW; 35 shp).

The submarine had a maximum surface speed of 9.7 knots (18.0 km/h; 11.2 mph) and a submerged speed of 12.5 knots (23.2 km/h; 14.4 mph). When submerged, the boat could operate at 4 knots (7.4 km/h; 4.6 mph) for 194 nautical miles (359 km; 223 mi); when surfaced, she could travel 2,600 nautical miles (4,800 km; 3,000 mi) at 8 knots (15 km/h; 9.2 mph). U-2323 was fitted with two 53.3 cm (21 in) torpedo tubes in the bow. She could carry two preloaded torpedoes. The complement was 14–18 men. This class of U-boat did not carry a deck gun.

== Service history ==
The seas around the German coastline were subject to very heavy allied attack during the final two years of the war, as the Royal Air Force sought to restrict German movement around their coasts by sowing thousands of air-dropped naval mines, thus delaying the production and training of new boats, disrupting coastal shipping and destroying several boats before they could become involved in the Battle of the Atlantic.

The U-2323 was a victim of this campaign, when on the 26 July 1944, just eight days old, she was sunk off Möltenort at the entrance to Kiel harbour on her maiden voyage. Two of her crew were killed in the blast, although the survivors managed to safely reach the shore. They were then transferred to other units. The holed boat was raised in early 1945, but was still undergoing repairs in Kiel at the time of the German surrender. It was broken up in situ post-war.

== Bibliography ==
- Busch, Rainer; Röll, Hans-Joachim (1999). German U-boat commanders of World War II : a biographical dictionary. Translated by Brooks, Geoffrey. London, Annapolis, Md: Greenhill Books, Naval Institute Press. ISBN 1-55750-186-6.
- Busch, Rainer; Röll, Hans-Joachim (1999). Deutsche U-Boot-Verluste von September 1939 bis Mai 1945 [German U-boat losses from September 1939 to May 1945]. Der U-Boot-Krieg (in German). Vol. IV. Hamburg, Berlin, Bonn: Mittler. ISBN 3-8132-0514-2.
- Gröner, Erich; Jung, Dieter; Maass, Martin (1991). U-boats and Mine Warfare Vessels. German Warships 1815–1945. Vol. 2. Translated by Thomas, Keith; Magowan, Rachel. London: Conway Maritime Press. ISBN 0-85177-593-4.
- Sharpe, Peter (1998). U-Boat Fact File. Great Britain: Midland Publishing. ISBN 1-85780-072-9.
