= Type XXIII submarine =

German coastal submarine class

- Rendering of a Type XXIII submarine

Class overview
- Builders: Deutsche Werft, Hamburg (48 boats); Germaniawerft, Kiel (13 boats)
- Operators: Kriegsmarine; German Navy; Volksmarine; Royal Navy; French Navy; Soviet Navy; Royal Norwegian Navy
- Preceded by: Type II submarine (Conventional coastal submarine); Type XVII submarine (AIP-powered coastal submarine)
- Succeeded by: Type 201 coastal submarine
- Built: 1944–1945
- In commission: 1944–1968
- Planned: 980
- Completed: 61
- Lost: 7

General characteristics
- Type: Coastal submarine
- Displacement: 234 t (258 short tons) surfaced; 258 t (284 short tons) submerged
- Length: 34.68 m (113 ft 9 1/2 in)
- Beam: 3.02 m (9 ft 11 in)
- Draft: 3.66 m (12 ft 0 in)
- Propulsion: 1 × MWM RS134S 6-cylinder diesel engine, 575–630 metric horsepower (423–463 kW; 567–621 shp); 1 × AEG GU4463-8 double-acting electric motor, 580 metric horsepower (427 kW; 572 shp); 1 × BBC CCR188 electric creeping motor, 35 metric horsepower (26 kW; 35 shp)
- Speed: 9.7 kn (18.0 km/h) surfaced; 12.5 kn (23 km/h) submerged
- Range: 2,600 nmi (4,800 km) at 8 kn (15 km/h) surfaced; 194 nmi (359 km) at 4 kn (7 km/h) submerged
- Test depth: 180 m (590 ft)
- Complement: 14–18
- Armament: 2 bow torpedo tubes; No reloads

German Type XXIII submarines were the first so-called elektroboote ("electric boats") to become operational. They were small coastal submarines designed to operate in the shallow waters of the North Sea, Black Sea and Mediterranean Sea, where larger Type XXI electric boats were at risk in World War II. They were so small they could carry only two torpedoes, which had to be loaded externally. As with their far larger sisters—the Type XXI—they were able to remain submerged almost all of the time and were faster than conventional U-boats, due to the improved streamlining of their shape, batteries with larger capacity and the snorkel, which allowed the diesel engines to be used while submerged. The Type XXI and XXIII U-boats revolutionized post-war submarine design. Nearly a thousand Type XXIII boats were projected towards the close of World War II, but most of these were either cancelled, scrapped incomplete, or only projected.

== Background ==
When development began on the Type XXI U-boat in late 1942, it was proposed to simultaneously develop a smaller version incorporating the same advanced technology to replace the Type II coastal submarine. Admiral Karl Dönitz added two requirements: as the boat would have to operate in the Mediterranean and the Black Sea, it had to be able to be transported by rail, and it had to use the standard 53.3 cm (21 in) torpedo tubes.

The development of the Type XXIII was given a high priority, with an emphasis on using existing components as much as possible. To reduce development time, Hellmuth Walter designed the new submarine based on the previous Type XXII prototype. By 30 June 1943 the design was ready and construction began in parallel at several shipyards in Germany, France, Italy and Ukraine. The lead contractor was Deutsche Werft in Hamburg.

As with the Type XXI, the Type XXIII was intended to be constructed in sections, various modules being produced by different subcontractors. Some were to be assembled at foreign yards, including U-2446 through U-2460 at the Deutsche Werft yard at Nikolaev, Southern Ukraine. These were reassigned to the Linzner yard on 1 May 1944 and subsequently cancelled. In the end, circumstances meant that construction was concentrated at Germaniawerft in Kiel and Deutsche Werft in Hamburg.

== Design ==
The Type XXIII had an all-welded single hull, the first submarine to use such a design. It had a fully streamlined outer casing and apart from the relatively small conning tower and a fairing which housed the diesel exhaust silencer, it had an uncluttered upper deck. In line with Walter's design practice, there were no forward hydroplanes, although these were added later.

The submarine was propelled by a single three-bladed propeller and steered by a single rudder. As with the Type XXI, the lower section of the figure-of-eight hull was used to house a large 62-cell battery.

In order to allow the boat to be transported by rail, the hull sections had to be limited in size to fit the standard loading gauge. For transportation, the hull was broken into four sections and the bridge was removed. Due to the space restrictions, the forward bow section had to be made as short as possible, which meant that only two torpedo tubes could be fitted and no reload torpedoes could be carried. The torpedoes were loaded by ballasting the submarine down at the stern so that the bow lifted clear of the water and the torpedoes could be loaded directly into their tubes from a barge. The Type XXIII proved to have excellent handling characteristics, and was highly maneuverable both on the surface and underwater. Its crash dive time was 9 seconds, and its maximum diving depth was 180 metres (98 fathoms). Submerged, its speed was 12 1/2 kn (23 km/h), and while surfaced its speed was 9 kn (17 km/h). A submerged speed of 10 1/2 kn (19 km/h) could be attained while snorkeling.

== Characteristics ==
A Type XXIII U-boat had an overall length of 34.86 m (114 ft 4 in), a beam of 3.02 m (9 ft 11 in) and a draft of 3.66 m (12 ft 0 in). The displacement on the surface was 234 t (230 long tons), and submerged 258 t (250 long tons). The length of the pressure hull was 24.60 m (80 ft 9 in) and had a maximum diameter of 2.80 m (9 ft 2 in).

The boat was powered on the surface by a six-cylinder, four-stroke MWM RS134S diesel engine, giving 575 brake horsepower (429 kW), which gave a maximum speed of 9.7 knots (18.0 km/h; 11.2 mph). With a fuel capacity of 20.76 t (20.43 long tons), the range was 4,450 nmi (8,240 km; 5,120 mi) at 6 knots (11 km/h; 6.9 mph) and 2,600 nmi (4,800 km; 3,000 mi) at 8 knots (15 km/h; 9.2 mph). When submerged it was propelled by a double-acting AEG GU 4463-8 electric motor, giving 427 kilowatts (573 hp). Maximum submerged speed was 12.5 knots (23.2 km/h; 14.4 mph) and maximum range was 194 nmi (359 km; 223 mi) at 4 knots (7.4 km/h; 4.6 mph) and 35 nmi (65 km; 40 mi) at 10 knots (19 km/h; 12 mph). For silent submerged propulsion a small BBC CCR188 electric motor giving 25.8 kilowatts (34.6 hp) was installed, which gave a maximum speed of 3.5 knots (6.5 km/h; 4.0 mph).

A Type XXII was equipped with two 53.3 cm (21.0 in) bow torpedo tubes, but did not have space internally for spare torpedoes. They did not have a deck gun nor any ant-aircraft armament. Their complement consisted of two officers and twelve men.

== Construction ==
The first forty-nine boats (U-2321 to U-2331, and U-2334 to U-2371) were ordered from Deutsche Werft, Hamburg, while two (U-2332 and U-2333) were ordered from Friedrich Krupp Germaniawerft's yard at Kiel. Twenty-nine further boats (U-2372 to U-2400) were ordered from Deutsche Werft's wartime occupied yards at Toulon, but the first nine of these were scrapped incomplete on the stocks and the remainder never commenced.

Another sixty were ordered to be built by the company at other yards in occupied nations - thirty at Genoa (U-2401 to U-2430), fifteen at Monfalcone (U-2431 to U-2445) and another fifteen at Nikolaev and Linz (U-2446 to U-2460), where a further forty (U-2461 to U-2500) were projected but never ordered. All of these were cancelled and never commenced.

Eight hundred additional units were intended to be built by Deutsche Werft - five hundred at Hamburg (U-4001 to U-4500), of which the first 120 were ordered and started were subsequently scrapped incomplete, with the others cancelled and never begun; and three hundred at Kiel (U-4701 to U-5000), where eleven (U-4701 to U-4712, exclude U-4708) were actually built (orders for U-4713 to U-4891 were cancelled, while U-4892 to U-5000 were projected only).

The first Type XXIII, U-2321, was launched from Deutsche Werft in Hamburg on 17 April 1944. It was one of six XXIIIs that went on operational patrol around the British Isles in early 1945. Forty-eight others followed from Deutsche Werft and fourteen from Germaniawerft of Kiel. U-4712 was the last one launched, on 1 March 1945.

== Service history ==
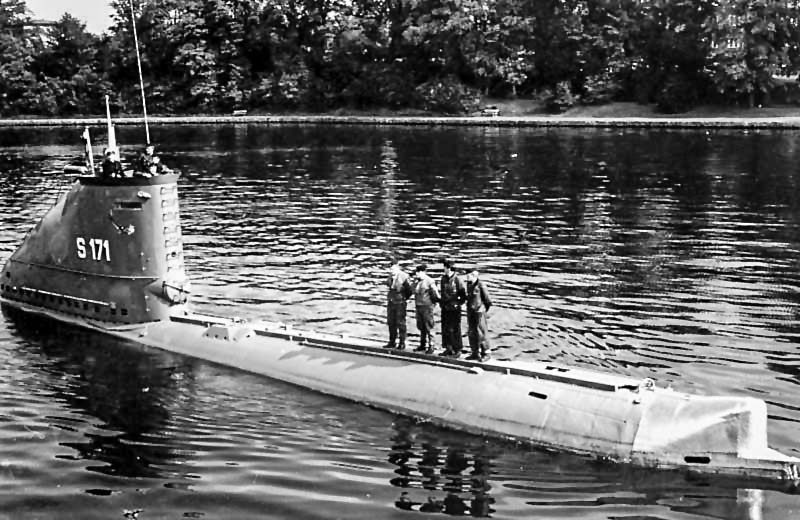
A XXIII U BOAT

None of the six operational Type XXIIIs - U-2321, U-2322, U-2324, U-2326, U-2329 and U-2336 - were sunk by the Allies' ships but they sank four ships for a total of 7,392 gross register tons (GRT).

The first war patrol of a Type XXIII began when U-2324 sailed from Kiel on 18 January 1945. Although she was to survive the war, she sank no enemy vessels. The first Type XXIII to achieve combat success was U-2322, commanded by Oberleutnant zur See Fridtjof Heckel. Sailing from a Norwegian base on 6 February 1945, she encountered a convoy off Berwick-upon-Tweed, and sank the coaster Egholm on 25 February. U-2321, operating from the same base, sank the coaster Gasray on 5 April 1945 off St Abbs Head. U-2336, under the command of Kapitänleutnant Emil Klusmeier, sank the last Allied ships lost in the European war on 7 May 1945, when she torpedoed the freighters Sneland I and Avondale Park off the Isle of May inside the Firth of Forth.

The Sneland I and the Avondale Park were sunk around 23:03, less than an hour before the official German surrender, and the Avondale Park was the last merchant ship to be sunk by a U-boat. At the time it was felt that Kapitänleutnant Klusmeier, who was on his first patrol, had deliberately ignored Dönitz's ceasefire order; Klusmeier claimed that he had never received the order.

== Losses ==
Seven Type XXIIIs were lost to various causes.

- U-2323 was sunk by a naval mine on 26 July 1944.
- U-2331 was lost in a training accident on 10 October 1944.
- U-2338 was sunk by British Beaufighter aircraft which killed 12 crewmen and sank the boat east-northeast of Fredericia in Denmark on 4 May 1945, before she ever went on combat patrol.
- U-2342 was mined and sunk on 26 December 1944.
- U-2344 was accidentally rammed and sunk by U-2336 on 18 February 1945.
- U-2359 was sunk by Allied aircraft on 2 May 1945.
- U-2367 was accidentally rammed and sunk by an unidentified U-boat on 5 May 1945.

In early May 1945, 31 XXIIIs were scuttled by their crews. 20 surrendered to the Allies and were sunk in Operation Deadlight. Only 3 – U-2326 (later British submarine N35), U-2353 (later British submarine N31, then Soviet submarine M-51), and U-4706 (later Norwegian submarine Knerter) – survived the war.

== Postwar ==
One Type XXIII was allocated to the Soviet Union under the terms of the Potsdam Agreement, and a second unit was reportedly salvaged in 1948.

In 1956, the Bundesmarine raised two Type XXIII boats, U-2365 (scuttled in the Kattegat in 1945) and U-2367 (which sank near Schleimünde following a collision with another U-boat), and recommissioned them as U-Hai (Shark) and U-Hecht (Pike), with pennant numbers S 170 and S 171 respectively. U-Hai sank in a gale off the Dogger Bank in September 1966, taking 19 of her 20 crewmen with her. Her loss is the greatest maritime post-war disaster that the German Navy has suffered. The experience gained from the two recommissioned submarines led to the construction of the Type 206 submarine, which was in use until 2011.

== Boats in class ==
Although a total of 980 Type XXIII submarines were planned, many were scrapped incomplete (or indeed never ordered in many cases), only the following 61 vessels were built:

- U-2321
- U-2322
- U-2323
- U-2324
- U-2325
- U-2326
- U-2327
- U-2328
- U-2329
- U-2330
- U-2331
- U-2332
- U-2333
- U-2334
- U-2335
- U-2336
- U-2337
- U-2338
- U-2339
- U-2340
- U-2341
- U-2342
- U-2343
- U-2344
- U-2345
- U-2346
- U-2347
- U-2348
- U-2349
- U-2350
- U-2351
- U-2352
- U-2353
- U-2354
- U-2355
- U-2356
- U-2357
- U-2358
- U-2359
- U-2360
- U-2361
- U-2362
- U-2363
- U-2364
- U-2365
- U-2366
- U-2367
- U-2368
- U-2369
- U-2371
- U-4701
- U-4702
- U-4703
- U-4704
- U-4705
- U-4706
- U-4707
- U-4709
- U-4710
- U-4711
- U-4712

== See also ==
- British R-class submarine
- Ha-201-class submarine

== Bibliography ==
- Bagnasco, Erminio (1977). Submarines of World War Two. Annapolis: Naval Institute Press. ISBN 0870219626.
- Herzog, Bodo (1993). Deutsche U-Boote: 1906−1966 [German U-boats: 1906−1966] (in German). Erlangen: Müller. ISBN 978-3-86070-036-5.
- Lenton, Trevor (1965). German Submarines 2. Navies of the Second World War. Macdonald & Co.
- Möller, Eberhard; Brack, Werner (2004). The Encyclopedia of U-Boats: from 1904 to the present. London: Chatham. ISBN 978-1-85367-623-9.
- Polmar, Norman; Noot, Jurrien (1991). Submarines of the Russian and Soviet Navies, 1718-1990. Naval Institute Press. ISBN 0-87021-570-1.
- Williamson, Gordon (2005). Wolf Pack: The Story of the U-boat in World War II. Osprey. ISBN 1841768723.
- Williamson, Gordon; Palmer, Ian (2002). Kriegsmarine U-boats 1939-45: Vol 2. Osprey Publishing. ISBN 1-84176-364-0.
- Rössler, Eberhard (2001). The U-boat: The evolution and technical history of German submarines. London: Cassell & Co. ISBN 0-304-36120-8.
- Lundy, Iain (25 January 2005). "Avondale Park". The Scotsman.
