= German submarine U-2331 =

German World War II submarine

Coordinates: 54°0′N 18°0′E

- Rendering of a Type XXIII submarine

History

Nazi Germany
- Name: U-2331
- Ordered: 20 September 1943
- Builder: Deutsche Werft, Hamburg
- Yard number: 485
- Laid down: 30 June 1944
- Launched: 22 August 1944
- Commissioned: 12 September 1944
- Fate: Sunk on 10 October 1944

General characteristics
- Class & type: Type XXIII submarine
- Displacement: 234 t (230 long tons) surfaced; 258 t (254 long tons) submerged
- Length: 34.68 m (113 ft 9 in)
- Beam: 3.02 m (9 ft 11 in)
- Draft: 3.66 m (12 ft)
- Propulsion: 1 × MWM RS134S 6-cylinder diesel engine, 575–630 metric horsepower (423–463 kW; 567–621 shp); 1 × AEG GU4463-8 double-acting electric motor, 580 metric horsepower (427 kW; 572 shp); 1 × BBC CCR188 electric creeping motor, 35 metric horsepower (26 kW; 35 shp)
- Speed: 9.7 knots (18 km/h; 11 mph) surfaced; 12.5 knots (23 km/h; 14 mph) submerged
- Range: 2,600 nmi (4,800 km; 3,000 mi) at 8 knots (15 km/h; 9.2 mph) surfaced; 194 nmi (359 km; 223 mi) at 4 knots (7.4 km/h; 4.6 mph) submerged
- Test depth: 180 m (590 ft)
- Complement: 14–18
- Armament: 2 bow torpedo tubes; 2 torpedoes

Service record
- Part of: 32nd U-boat Flotilla; 12 September – 10 October 1944
- Identification codes: M 44 322
- Commanders: Oblt.z.S. Hans-Walter Pahl; 12 September – 10 October 1944
- Operations: None
- Victories: None

German submarine U-2331 was a Type XXIII U-boat built for Nazi Germany's Kriegsmarine during World War II and intended for service against allied shipping in coastal waters. She was a brand new, high-technology electric U-boat which was lost when only one month old in a bizarre training accident in the Baltic Sea. Built at Hamburg, she was constructed at speed, as she and her sisters were seen as war winning weapons and thus vitally important to the German war effort.

== Design ==
Like all Type XXIII U-boats, U-2331 had a displacement of 234 tonnes (230 long tons) when at the surface and 258 tonnes (254 long tons) while submerged. She had a total length of 34.68 m (113 ft 9 in) (o/a), a beam width of 3.02 m (9 ft 11 in) (o/a), and a draught depth of3.66 m (12 ft). The submarine was powered by one MWM six-cylinder RS134S diesel engine providing 575–630 metric horsepower (423–463 kilowatts; 567–621 shaft horsepower), one AEG GU4463-8 double-acting electric motor electric motor providing 580 PS (430 kW; 570 shp), and one BBC silent running CCR188 electric motor providing 35 PS (26 kW; 35 shp).

The submarine had a maximum surface speed of 9.7 knots (18.0 km/h; 11.2 mph) and a submerged speed of 12.5 knots (23.2 km/h; 14.4 mph). When submerged, the boat could operate at 4 knots (7.4 km/h; 4.6 mph) for 194 nautical miles (359 km; 223 mi); when surfaced, she could travel 2,600 nautical miles (4,800 km; 3,000 mi) at 8 knots (15 km/h; 9.2 mph). U-2331 was fitted with two 53.3 cm (21 in) torpedo tubes in the bow. She could carry two preloaded torpedoes. The complement was 14–18 men. This class of U-boat did not carry a deck gun.

== Service history ==
Completed in September 1944, U-2331 was undergoing a fast-track working-up period in the Baltic under her commander Oberleutnant zur See Hans-Walter Pahl under the observation of Klaus Vernier, a highly experienced U-boat commander and tactical expert. On 10 October, just 28 days after her completion, U-2331 dived and failed to surface in the sea off the Hel Peninsula. Four of the reduced crew (including the captain), escaped the sinking ship but 15 did not, including Vernier.

The Kriegsmarine conducted an investigation into the loss, at which it was revealed that either the captain or Vernier had ordered the submarine to submerge whilst travelling in reverse, thus unbalancing the boat and causing her to sink uncontrollably. A handful of men on the conning tower survived as the boat sank under them. The wreck was raised and taken to Gotenhafen (Gdynia, Poland), but the time submerged underwater had irreparably damaged the boat's systems, and the remains were scrapped.

== Bibliography ==
- Busch, Rainer; Röll, Hans-Joachim (1999). German U-boat commanders of World War II : a biographical dictionary. Translated by Brooks, Geoffrey. London, Annapolis, Md: Greenhill Books, Naval Institute Press. ISBN 1-55750-186-6.
- Busch, Rainer; Röll, Hans-Joachim (1999). Deutsche U-Boot-Verluste von September 1939 bis Mai 1945 [German U-boat losses from September 1939 to May 1945]. Der U-Boot-Krieg (in German). Vol. IV. Hamburg, Berlin, Bonn: Mittler. ISBN 3-8132-0514-2.
- Gröner, Erich; Jung, Dieter; Maass, Martin (1991). U-boats and Mine Warfare Vessels. German Warships 1815–1945. Vol. 2. Translated by Thomas, Keith; Magowan, Rachel. London: Conway Maritime Press. ISBN 0-85177-593-4.
- Sharpe, Peter (1998). U-Boat Fact File. Great Britain: Midland Publishing. ISBN 1-85780-072-9.
