= German submarine U-2333 =

German World War II submarine

- Postwar photo of Hecht (S 171), (former Type XXIII submarine U-2367). An identical sister ship of U-2333.

History

Nazi Germany
- Name: U-2333
- Ordered: 7 July 1944
- Builder: Friedrich Krupp Germaniawerft AG, Kiel
- Yard number: 942
- Laid down: 27 September 1944
- Launched: 16 November 1944
- Commissioned: 18 December 1944
- Fate: Scuttled on 5 May 1945

General characteristics
- Class & type: Type XXIII submarine
- Displacement: 234 t (230 long tons) (surfaced); 258 t (254 long tons) (submerged)
- Length: 34.68 m (113 ft 9 in) (o/a); 26.00 m (85 ft 4 in) (p/h)
- Beam: 3.02 m (9 ft 11 in) (o/a); 3.00 m (9 ft 10 in) (p/h)
- Draught: 3.66 m (12 ft)
- Installed power: 575–630 PS (423–463 kW; 567–621 shp) (diesel drive); 580 PS (430 kW; 570 shp) (standard electric drive); 35 PS (26 kW; 35 shp) (silent electric drive)
- Propulsion: 1 × MWM RS134S 6-cylinder diesel engine; 1 × AEG GU4463-8 double-acting electric motor; 1 × BBC CCR188 electric creeping motor
- Speed: 9.7 knots (18 km/h; 11 mph) (surfaced); 12.5 knots (23 km/h; 14 mph) (submerged)
- Range: 2,600 nautical miles (4,800 km; 3,000 mi) at 8 knots (15 km/h; 9.2 mph) surfaced; 194 nmi (359 km; 223 mi) at 4 knots (7.4 km/h; 4.6 mph) submerged
- Test depth: 180 m (590 ft)
- Complement: 14–18
- Armament: 2 × bow torpedo tubes; 2 × 53.3 cm (21 in) torpedoes

Service record
- Part of: 5th U-boat Flotilla; 18 December 1944 – 5 May 1945
- Identification codes: M 44 442
- Commanders: Oblt.z.S. Heinz Baumann; 18 December 1944 – 5 May 1945
- Operations: None
- Victories: None

German submarine U-2333 was a Type XXIII U-boat of Nazi Germany's Kriegsmarine during World War II. She was ordered on 7 July 1944, and was laid down on 27 September 1944 at Friedrich Krupp Germaniawerft AG, Kiel, as yard number 942. She was launched on 16 November 1944 and commissioned under the command of Oberleutnant zur See Heinz Baumann on 18 December 1944.

== Design ==
Like all Type XXIII U-boats, U-2333 had a displacement of 234 tonnes (230 long tons) when at the surface and 258 tonnes (254 long tons) while submerged. She had a total length of 34.68 m (113 ft 9 in) (o/a), a beam width of 3.02 m (9 ft 11 in) (o/a), and a draught depth of3.66 m (12 ft). The submarine was powered by one MWM six-cylinder RS134S diesel engine providing 575–630 metric horsepower (423–463 kilowatts; 567–621 shaft horsepower), one AEG GU4463-8 double-acting electric motor electric motor providing 580 PS (430 kW; 570 shp), and one BBC silent running CCR188 electric motor providing 35 PS (26 kW; 35 shp).

The submarine had a maximum surface speed of 9.7 knots (18.0 km/h; 11.2 mph) and a submerged speed of 12.5 knots (23.2 km/h; 14.4 mph). When submerged, the boat could operate at 4 knots (7.4 km/h; 4.6 mph) for 194 nautical miles (359 km; 223 mi); when surfaced, she could travel 2,600 nautical miles (4,800 km; 3,000 mi) at 8 knots (15 km/h; 9.2 mph). U-2333 was fitted with two 53.3 cm (21 in) torpedo tubes in the bow. She could carry two preloaded torpedoes. The complement was 14–18 men. This class of U-boat did not carry a deck gun.

== Service history ==
On 5 May 1945, U-2333 was scuttled in Gelting Bay near Gelting as part of Operation Regenbogen. The wreck was later raised and broken up.

== See also ==
- Battle of the Atlantic

== Bibliography ==
- Busch, Rainer; Röll, Hans-Joachim (1999). German U-boat commanders of World War II : a biographical dictionary. Translated by Brooks, Geoffrey. London, Annapolis, Md: Greenhill Books, Naval Institute Press. ISBN 1-55750-186-6.
- Gröner, Erich; Jung, Dieter; Maass, Martin (1991). U-boats and Mine Warfare Vessels. German Warships 1815–1945. Vol. 2. Translated by Thomas, Keith; Magowan, Rachel. London: Conway Maritime Press. ISBN 0-85177-593-4.
- Williamson, Gordon (2005). Wolf Pack: The Story of the U-boat in World War II. Osprey. ISBN 1841768723.
