= German submarine U-2353 =

German World War II submarine

- Postwar photo of Hecht (S 171), (former Type XXIII submarine U-2367). An identical sister ship of U-2353.

History

Nazi Germany
- Name: U-2353
- Ordered: 20 September 1944
- Builder: Deutsche Werft AG, Hamburg
- Yard number: 507
- Laid down: 10 October 1944
- Launched: 6 December 1944
- Commissioned: 9 January 1945
- Fate: Surrendered on 9 May 1945

Soviet Union
- Name: M-51
- Commissioned: 13 February 1946
- Stricken: 17 March 1952
- Fate: Broken up in 1963

General characteristics
- Class & type: Type XXIII submarine
- Displacement: 234 t (230 long tons) (surfaced); 258 t (254 long tons) (submerged)
- Length: 34.68 m (113 ft 9 in) (o/a); 26.00 m (85 ft 4 in) (p/h)
- Beam: 3.02 m (9 ft 11 in) (o/a); 3.00 m (9 ft 10 in) (p/h)
- Draught: 3.66 m (12 ft)
- Installed power: 575–630 PS (423–463 kW; 567–621 shp) (diesel drive); 580 PS (430 kW; 570 shp) (standard electric drive); 35 PS (26 kW; 35 shp) (silent electric drive)
- Propulsion: 1 × MWM RS134S 6-cylinder diesel engine; 1 × AEG GU4463-8 double-acting electric motor; 1 × BBC CCR188 electric creeping motor
- Speed: 9.7 knots (18 km/h; 11 mph) (surfaced); 12.5 knots (23 km/h; 14 mph) (submerged)
- Range: 2,600 nautical miles (4,800 km; 3,000 mi) at 8 knots (15 km/h; 9.2 mph) surfaced; 194 nmi (359 km; 223 mi) at 4 knots (7.4 km/h; 4.6 mph) submerged
- Test depth: 180 m (590 ft)
- Complement: 14–18
- Armament: 2 × 53.3 cm (21 in) bow torpedo tubes; 2 × torpedoes

Service record (Kriegsmarine)
- Part of: 32nd U-boat Flotilla; 9 January – 15 February 1945; 4th U-boat Flotilla; 16 February – 8 May 1945
- Identification codes: M 50 310
- Commanders: Oblt.z.S. Jürgen Hillmann; 9 January – 9 May 1945
- Operations: None
- Victories: None

German submarine U-2353 was a Type XXIII U-boat of Nazi Germany's Kriegsmarine during World War II. She was ordered on 20 September 1944, and was laid down on 10 October 1944 at Deutsche Werft AG, Hamburg, as yard number 507. She was launched on 6 December 1944 and commissioned under the command of Oberleutnant zur See Jürgen Hillmann on 9 January 1945.

== Design ==
Like all Type XXIII U-boats, U-2353 had a displacement of 234 tonnes (230 long tons) when at the surface and 258 tonnes (254 long tons) while submerged. She had a total length of 34.68 m (113 ft 9 in) (o/a), a beam width of 3.02 m (9 ft 11 in) (o/a), and a draught depth of 3.66 m (12 ft). The submarine was powered by one MWM six-cylinder RS134S diesel engine providing 575–630 metric horsepower (423–463 kilowatts; 567–621 shaft horsepower), one AEG GU4463-8 double-acting electric motor providing 580 PS (430 kW; 570 shp), and one BBC silent running CCR188 electric motor providing 35 PS (26 kW; 35 shp).

The submarine had a maximum surface speed of 9.7 knots (18.0 km/h; 11.2 mph) and a submerged speed of 12.5 knots (23.2 km/h; 14.4 mph). When submerged, the boat could operate at 4 knots (7.4 km/h; 4.6 mph) for 194 nautical miles (359 km; 223 mi); when surfaced, she could travel 2,600 nautical miles (4,800 km; 3,000 mi) at 8 knots (15 km/h; 9.2 mph). U-2353 was fitted with two 53.3 cm (21 in) torpedo tubes in the bow. She could carry two preloaded torpedoes. The complement was 14 – 18 men. This class of U-boat did not carry a deck gun.

== Service history ==
On 9 May 1945, U-2353 surrendered at Kristiansand, Norway. She was later transferred to Loch Ryan, Scotland on 29 May 1945.

== Post war service ==
The TNC allocated U-2353 to the Soviet Union. On 4 December 1945, she arrived in Libau, Latvia, as British N-class N31. On 13 February 1946, the Soviet Navy allocated her to the Baltic Fleet. She was renamed M-51 on 9 June 1949 then sent to the reserve fleet on 22 December 1950 as a training hulk. She was finally struck from the Soviet Navy on 17 March 1952, and broken up for scrap in 1963.

== See also ==
- Battle of the Atlantic

== Bibliography ==
- Busch, Rainer; Röll, Hans-Joachim (1999). German U-boat commanders of World War II : a biographical dictionary. Translated by Brooks, Geoffrey. London, Annapolis, Md: Greenhill Books, Naval Institute Press. ISBN 1-55750-186-6.
- Gröner, Erich; Jung, Dieter; Maass, Martin (1991). U-boats and Mine Warfare Vessels. German Warships 1815–1945. Vol. 2. Translated by Thomas, Keith; Magowan, Rachel. London: Conway Maritime Press. ISBN 0-85177-593-4.
- Williamson, Gordon (2005). Wolf Pack: The Story of the U-boat in World War II. Osprey. ISBN 1841768723.
