= List of shipwrecks in November 1945 =

The list of shipwrecks in November 1945 includes ships sunk, foundered, grounded, or otherwise lost during November 1945.

== 1 November ==
List of shipwrecks: 1 November 1945
Ship	State	Description
Seal	United States	The 43-gross register ton, 58-foot (18 m) fishing vessel sank in the harbor at Seldovia, Alaska.

== 3 November ==
List of shipwrecks: 3 November 1945
Ship	State	Description
Atlas	Panama	The 4,810 GRT collier ran aground on the Bougainville Reef. She was a total loss.
Senko Maru	Imperial Japanese Navy	Indonesian War of Independence: The Senko Maru-class transport was bombed and sunk at Emma Haven, Padang, Sumatra, Netherlands East Indies, by Dutch aircraft. She had been seized by Indonesian rebels on 11 October 1945.

== 4 November ==
List of shipwrecks: 4 November 1945
Ship	State	Description
HMS MFV 12186	Royal Navy	The MFV 1001-class motor fishing vessel sank off North Scroby after colliding with HMS MFV 1161 (Royal Navy).

== 5 November ==
List of shipwrecks: 5 November 1945
Ship	State	Description
Edinburgh Castle	United Kingdom	The ocean liner, after being declared not worth to tow back to England, was sunk as an exercise target by gunfire from the armed trawler Cape Warwick, HMS Portchester Castle and HMS Launceston Castle (all Royal Navy), some 60 nautical miles (110 km) off Freetown.

== 6 November ==
List of shipwrecks: 6 November 1945
Ship	State	Description
USS Oberrender	United States Navy	The decommissioned John C. Butler-class destroyer escort was sunk as a gunnery target in the Pacific Ocean.

== 8 November ==
List of shipwrecks: 8 November 1945
Ship	State	Description
Cambria	United Kingdom	The cargo ship collided with Almirante Rodrigues Luis (Uruguay) and sank at Montevideo, Uruguay.
F 511	Kriegsmarine	The surrendered Type C Marinefahrprahm was sunk by a mine in the Baltic Sea with the loss of 26 lives.
Hai Chu	China	The ship struck a mine in the Pearl River at Bocca Tigris and sank with the loss of 500 lives.
USS Hogan	United States Navy	The Wickes-class destroyer was bombed and sunk as a target in the Pacific Ocean off San Diego, California.
Prosper Schiaffino	France	The cargo ship struck a mine and sank off Porquerolles, Var.

== 9 November ==
List of shipwrecks: 9 November 1945
Ship	State	Description
FS-290	United States Army	The Design 381 coastal freighter sank in a typhoon off Okinawa.
FS-406	United States Army	The Design 381 coastal freighter was wrecked on a reef in a typhoon at Okinawa.
FS-410	United States Army	The Design 381 coastal freighter was lost in a typhoon at Okinawa.

== 10 November ==
List of shipwrecks: 10 November 1945
Ship	State	Description
Abbot L. Mills	United States	World War II: The Liberty ship struck a mine and was damaged at Dubrovnik, Yugoslavia. She was declared a constructive total loss but was sold, repaired and returned to service.
HMCS Assiniboine	Royal Canadian Navy	The decommissioned C-class destroyer ran aground at East Point, Prince Edward Island (46°28′30″N 61°58′00″W) when her tow parted whilst she was on the way to be broken up. Scrapped in place in 1952.

== 12 November ==
List of shipwrecks: 12 November 1945
Ship	State	Description
Hokkai Maru	Imperial Japanese Navy	Indonesian War of Independence: The Kinai Maru-class auxiliary transport (8,416 GRT, 1933) caught fire, burned, and sank at Surabaya. The Indonesian People's Front had seized control of the ship on 2 October 1945.
William Hume	United States	The Liberty ship struck a mine and was damaged in the Adriatic Sea off Istria, Yugoslavia, She was taken in tow but sank at 45°36′N 14°41′E.

== 14 November ==
List of shipwrecks: 14 November 1945
Ship	State	Description
Two unidentified junks	North Vietnam Navy	First Indochina War; Battle of Co To Island: The unidentified junks, being used to transport troops, were destroyed by French forces.

== 17 November ==
List of shipwrecks: 17 November 1945
Ship	State	Description
Amstel	Netherlands	The cargo ship struck a mine and sank in the Baltic Sea (54°36′36″N 10°49′30″E).
Edith Howaldt	Allied-occupied Germany	The cargo ship was scuttled in the Skagerrak with a cargo of chemical ammunition.
Jantje Fritzen	Allied-occupied Germany	The cargo ship was scuttled in the North Sea with a cargo of obsolete ammunition.
Sesostris	Allied-occupied Germany	The cargo ship was scuttled in the North Sea with a cargo of obsolete chemical ammunition.
Tagila	Allied-occupied Germany	The cargo ship was scuttled in the Skagerrak with a cargo of gas munitions.
Taurus	Allied-occupied Germany	The cargo ship was scuttled in the Skagerrak.
Theda Fritzen	Allied-occupied Germany	The cargo ship was scuttled in the Skagerrak with a cargo of high-risk munitions.

== 19 November ==
List of shipwrecks: 19 November 1945
Ship	State	Description
Cedar Mills	United States	The T2 tanker struck a mine and sank off Ancona Italy. She was on a voyage from Philadelphia, Pennsylvania to Taranto, Italy.

== 20 November ==
List of shipwrecks: 20 November 1945
Ship	State	Description
Charles C. Glover	United States	The Liberty ship struck a mine in the Loire and sank. The wreck was sold for scrap in October 1946.

== 21 November ==
List of shipwrecks: 21 November 1945
Ship	State	Description
Ingénieur Général Haarbleicher	France	The cargo ship ran aground in fog at Stromboli, Italy. She was on a voyage from Marseille, Bouches-du-Rhône to Saigon, French Indochina. Ingénieur Général Haarbleicher later broke in two in a storm. Declared a total loss. She was scrapped in situ in 1947.
Sagona	Panama	The passenger and freight ferry was on route from Nice to Toulon when she struck a mine near Porquerolles Island and sank.

== 22 November ==
List of shipwrecks: 22 November 1945
Ship	State	Description
USS Canandaigua	United States Navy	The unclassified miscellaneous vessel sank in the Atlantic Ocean off the coast of Connecticut. The wreck was later raised and sold.
Kiyokawa Maru	Imperial Japanese Navy	The Kamikawa Maru-class seaplane tender, aground off Shida Beach, north of Kamioseki, Japan, since 20 July 1945, sank in heavy weather. She was raised in December 1948 and later was repaired and put in Japanese civilian passenger service.

== 27 November ==
List of shipwrecks: 25 November 1945
Ship	State	Description
U-2321	Kriegsmarine	Operation Deadlight: The Type XXIII submarine was shelled and sunk in the Atlantic Ocean (56°10′N 10°05′W) by ORP Błyskawica (Polish Navy) and HMS Onslow (Royal Navy).
U-2322	Kriegsmarine	Operation Deadlight: The Type XXIII submarine was shelled and sunk in the Atlantic Ocean (56°10′N 10°05′W) by ORP Błyskawica (Polish Navy) and HMS Onslow (Royal Navy).
U-2324	Kriegsmarine	Operation Deadlight: The Type XXIII submarine was shelled and sunk in the Atlantic Ocean (56°10′N 10°05′W) by ORP Błyskawica (Polish Navy) and HMS Onslow (Royal Navy).
U-2328	Kriegsmarine	Operation Deadlight: The Type XXIII submarine foundered in the Atlantic Ocean (56°12′N 9°48′W) whilst under tow to be scuttled.
U-2345	Kriegsmarine	Operation Deadlight: The Type XXIII submarine was scuttled in the Atlantic Ocean (56°10′N 10°05′W).
U-2361	Kriegsmarine	Operation Deadlight: The Type XXIII submarine was shelled and sunk in the Atlantic Ocean (56°10′N 10°05′W) by ORP Błyskawica (Polish Navy) and HMS Onslow (Royal Navy).

== 28 November ==
List of shipwrecks: 28 November 1945
Ship	State	Description
Texaco barge No. 397	United States	The oil barge broke adrift from an oil tanker off Bridgeport Harbor in a violent rain and snowstorm, with near hurricane force winds. Four hours later, in the dark, it smashed onto Penfield Reef (The Cows) off Fairfield, Connecticut. The next morning the two crewmen were rescued by a Sikorsky R-5 helicopter using a drop hoist, the first rescue using that method.
U-2325	Kriegsmarine	Operation Deadlight: The Type XXIII submarine was shelled and sunk in the Atlantic Ocean (56°10′N 10°05′W) by ORP Błyskawica (Polish Navy) and HMS Onslow (Royal Navy).
U-2329	Kriegsmarine	Operation Deadlight: The Type XXIII submarine was shelled and sunk in the Atlantic Ocean (56°10′N 10°05′W) by HMS Onslow (Royal Navy) and ORP Piorun (Polish Navy).
U-2334	Kriegsmarine	Operation Deadlight: The Type XXIII submarine was shelled and sunk in the Atlantic Ocean (56°10′N 10°05′W) by HMS Onslow (Royal Navy) and ORP Piorun (Polish Navy).
U-2335	Kriegsmarine	Operation Deadlight: The Type XXIII submarine was shelled and sunk in the Atlantic Ocean (56°10′N 10°05′W) by HMS Onslow (Royal Navy) and ORP Piorun (Polish Navy).
U-2338	Kriegsmarine	Operation Deadlight: The Type XXIII submarine was shelled and sunk in the Atlantic Ocean (56°10′N 10°05′W) by HMS Onslow (Royal Navy) and ORP Piorun (Polish Navy).
U-2350	Kriegsmarine	Operation Deadlight: The Type XXIII submarine was shelled and sunk in the Atlantic Ocean (56°10′N 10°05′W) by HMS Onslow (Royal Navy) and ORP Piorun (Polish Navy).
U-2363	Kriegsmarine	Operation Deadlight: The Type XXIII submarine was shelled and sunk in the Atlantic Ocean (56°10′N 10°05′W) by HMS Onslow (Royal Navy) and ORP Piorun (Polish Navy).

== 29 November ==
List of shipwrecks: 29 November 1945
Ship	State	Description
Hollywood	United States	The cargo ship ran aground off Cape Finisterre, Spain. She was a total loss.
Neah	United States	The 42-gross register ton, 58.9-foot (18.0 m) fishing vessel was destroyed by fire in Boulder Bay (60°54′N 146°38′W) in Prince William Sound on the south-central coast of the Territory of Alaska.
Trompenburg	Netherlands	The cargo ship was driven ashore on "Ulvo Island". She was refloated but drove ashore again and was a total loss
U-298	Kriegsmarine	Operation Deadlight: The Type VIIC/41 submarine was scuttled in the Atlantic Ocean (55°35′N 7°54′W).
U-312	Kriegsmarine	Operation Deadlight: The Type VIIC submarine was scuttled in the Atlantic Ocean (55°35′N 7°54′W).
U-968	Kriegsmarine	Operation Deadlight: The Type VIIC submarine was scuttled in the Atlantic Ocean (55°24′N 6°22′W).

== 30 November ==
List of shipwrecks: 30 November 1945
Ship	State	Description
Outarde	Canada	A storm smashed the lake freighter against the Consul-Hall Coal Dock at Clayton, New York. Salvage and repairs to the ship were not complete until June 1946.
U-170	Kriegsmarine	Operation Deadlight: The Type IXC/40 submarine was scuttled in the Atlantic Ocean (55°44′N 7°53′W).
U-281	Kriegsmarine	Operation Deadlight: The Type VIIC submarine was scuttled in the Atlantic Ocean (55°50′N 10°05′W).
U-328	Kriegsmarine	Operation Deadlight: The Type VIIC/41 submarine was scuttled in the Atlantic Ocean (55°50′N 10°05′W).
U-369	Kriegsmarine	Operation Deadlight: The Type VIIC submarine was scuttled in the Atlantic Ocean (55°31′N 7°27′W).
U-481	Kriegsmarine	Operation Deadlight: The Type VIIC submarine was scuttled in the Atlantic Ocean (56°11′N 10°00′W).
U-868	Kriegsmarine	Operation Deadlight: The Type IXC/40 submarine was scuttled in the Atlantic Ocean (55°48′N 8°33′W).
U.S.O.	United States	The Liberty ship ran aground on the Goodwin Sands, Kent, United Kingdom. Refloated the next day.

== Unknown date ==
List of shipwrecks: Unknown date November 1945
Ship	State	Description
Hazel	United States	The 10-gross register ton 39-foot (11.9 m) fishing vessel was wrecked at Cordova, Territory of Alaska.
