= 32nd U-boat Flotilla =

32. Unterseebootsflottille
- Active: April 1944–May 1945
- Country: Nazi Germany
- Branch: Kriegsmarine
- Type: U-boat flotilla
- Garrison/HQ: Königsberg (April 1944–January 1945); Hamburg (January–May 1945)

Commanders
- Notable commanders: Korvkpt. Ulrich Heyse (March–May 1945)

32nd U-boat Flotilla ("32. Unterseebootsflottille") was a training flotilla ("Ausbildungsflottille") of Nazi Germany's Kriegsmarine during World War II.

The flotilla was formed in Königsberg, in April 1944 under the command of Fregattenkapitan Hermann Rigele. It trained mostly Type XXIII U-boats. It was transferred to Hamburg in January 1945, and in March put under the command of Korvettenkapitän Ulrich Heyse. The flotilla was disbanded in May 1945 after the German surrender.

== Flotilla commanders ==
- Fregattenkapitan Hermann Rigele (April 1944–March 1945)
- Korvettenkapitän Ulrich Heyse (March–May 1945)

== Assigned U-boats ==
Forty-three U-boats were assigned to this flotilla during its service.

- U-2321
- U-2322
- U-2324
- U-2325
- U-2326
- U-2327
- U-2328
- U-2329
- U-2330
- U-2331
- U-2334
- U-2335
- U-2336
- U-2337
- U-2338
- U-2339
- U-2340
- U-2341
- U-2342
- U-2343
- U-2344
- U-2345
- U-2346
- U-2347
- U-2348
- U-2349
- U-2350
- U-2351
- U-2352
- U-2353
- U-2354
- U-2355
- U-2356
- U-2357
- U-2358
- U-2359
- U-2360
- U-2361
- U-2362
- U-2363
- U-2364
- U-3001
- U-3002
