= German submarine U-2329 =

German World War II submarine

- Rendering of a Type XXIII submarine

History

Nazi Germany
- Name: U-2329
- Ordered: 20 September 1943
- Builder: Deutsche Werft, Hamburg
- Yard number: 483
- Laid down: 2 June 1944
- Launched: 11 August 1944
- Commissioned: 1 September 1944
- Fate: Surrendered on 9 May 1945; Sunk on 28 November 1945 during Operation Deadlight

General characteristics
- Class & type: Type XXIII submarine
- Displacement: 234 t (230 long tons) (surfaced); 258 t (254 long tons) (submerged)
- Length: 34.68 m (113 ft 9 in) (o/a); 26.00 m (85 ft 4 in) (p/h)
- Beam: 3.02 m (9 ft 11 in) (o/a); 3.00 m (9 ft 10 in) (p/h)
- Draught: 3.66 m (12 ft)
- Installed power: 575–630 PS (423–463 kW; 567–621 shp) (diesel drive); 580 PS (430 kW; 570 shp) (standard electric drive); 35 PS (26 kW; 35 shp) (silent electric drive)
- Propulsion: 1 × MWM RS134S 6-cylinder diesel engine; 1 × AEG GU4463-8 double-acting electric motor; 1 × BBC CCR188 electric creeping motor
- Speed: 9.7 knots (18 km/h; 11 mph) (surfaced); 12.5 knots (23 km/h; 14 mph) (submerged)
- Range: 2,600 nautical miles (4,800 km; 3,000 mi) at 8 knots (15 km/h; 9.2 mph) surfaced; 194 nmi (359 km; 223 mi) at 4 knots (7.4 km/h; 4.6 mph) submerged
- Test depth: 180 m (590 ft)
- Complement: 14–18
- Armament: 2 × 53.3 cm (21 in) bow torpedo tubes; 2 × torpedoes

Service record
- Part of: 32nd U-boat Flotilla; 1 September 1944 – 14 March 1945; 11th U-boat Flotilla; 15 March – 8 May 1945
- Identification codes: M 41 607
- Commanders: Lt.z.S. / Oblt.z.S. Heinrich Schlott; 1 September 1944 – 9 May 1945
- Operations: 1 patrol: 11 – 26 April 1945
- Victories: None

German submarine U-2329 was a Type XXIII U-boat of Nazi Germany's Kriegsmarine during World War II. She was ordered on 20 September 1943, and was laid down on 2 June 1944 at Deutsche Werft, Hamburg, as yard number 483. She was launched on 11 August 1944 and commissioned under the command of Leutnant zur See Heinrich Schlott on 1 September 1944.

== Design ==
Like all Type XXIII U-boats, U-2329 had a displacement of 234 tonnes (230 long tons) when at the surface and 258 tonnes (254 long tons) while submerged. She had a total length of 34.68 m (113 ft 9 in) (o/a), a beam width of 3.02 m (9 ft 11 in) (o/a), and a draught depth of3.66 m (12 ft). The submarine was powered by one MWM six-cylinder RS134S diesel engine providing 575–630 metric horsepower (423–463 kilowatts; 567–621 shaft horsepower), one AEG GU4463-8 double-acting electric motor electric motor providing 580 PS (430 kW; 570 shp), and one BBC silent running CCR188 electric motor providing 35 PS (26 kW; 35 shp).

The submarine had a maximum surface speed of 9.7 knots (18.0 km/h; 11.2 mph) and a submerged speed of 12.5 knots (23.2 km/h; 14.4 mph). When submerged, the boat could operate at 4 knots (7.4 km/h; 4.6 mph) for 194 nautical miles (359 km; 223 mi); when surfaced, she could travel 2,600 nautical miles (4,800 km; 3,000 mi) at 8 knots (15 km/h; 9.2 mph). U-2329 was fitted with two 53.3 cm (21 in) torpedo tubes in the bow. She could carry two preloaded torpedoes. The complement was 14–18 men. This class of U-boat did not carry a deck gun.

== Service history ==
On 9 May 1945, U-2329 surrendered at Stavanger, Norway. She was later transferred to Loch Ryan, Scotland in June 1945. Of the 156 U-boats that eventually surrendered to the Allied forces at the end of the war, U-2329 was one of 116 selected to take part in Operation Deadlight. U-2329 was towed out to be sunk on 28 November 1945, by gunfire from the British destroyer HMS Onslow and the Polish destroyer ORP Piorun.

The wreck now lies at 56°10′N 10°05′W.

== See also ==
- Battle of the Atlantic

== Bibliography ==
- Busch, Rainer; Röll, Hans-Joachim (1999). German U-boat commanders of World War II : a biographical dictionary. Translated by Brooks, Geoffrey. London, Annapolis, Md: Greenhill Books, Naval Institute Press. ISBN 1-55750-186-6.
- Gröner, Erich; Jung, Dieter; Maass, Martin (1991). U-boats and Mine Warfare Vessels. German Warships 1815–1945. Vol. 2. Translated by Thomas, Keith; Magowan, Rachel. London: Conway Maritime Press. ISBN 0-85177-593-4.
- Williamson, Gordon (2005). Wolf Pack: The Story of the U-boat in World War II. Osprey. ISBN 1841768723.
