= German submarine U-2324 =

German World War II submarine

- Rendering of a Type XXIII submarine

History

Nazi Germany
- Name: U-2324
- Ordered: 20 September 1943
- Builder: Deutsche Werft, Hamburg
- Yard number: 478
- Laid down: 21 April 1944
- Launched: 16 June 1944
- Commissioned: 25 July 1944
- Fate: Surrendered on 9 May 1945; Sunk as target on 27 November 1945 during Operation Deadlight

General characteristics
- Class & type: Type XXIII submarine
- Displacement: 234 t (230 long tons) surfaced; 258 t (254 long tons) submerged
- Length: 34.68 m (113 ft 9 in)
- Beam: 3.02 m (9 ft 11 in)
- Draft: 3.66 m (12 ft)
- Propulsion: 1 × MWM RS134S 6-cylinder diesel engine, 575–630 metric horsepower (423–463 kW; 567–621 shp); 1 × AEG GU4463-8 double-acting electric motor, 580 metric horsepower (427 kW; 572 shp); 1 × BBC CCR188 electric creeping motor, 35 metric horsepower (26 kW; 35 shp)
- Speed: 9.7 knots (18 km/h; 11 mph) surfaced; 12.5 knots (23 km/h; 14 mph) submerged
- Range: 2,600 nmi (4,800 km; 3,000 mi) at 8 knots (15 km/h; 9.2 mph) surfaced; 194 nmi (359 km; 223 mi) at 4 knots (7.4 km/h; 4.6 mph) submerged
- Test depth: 180 m (590 ft)
- Complement: 14–18
- Armament: 2 bow torpedo tubes; 2 torpedoes

Service record
- Part of: 4th U-boat Flotilla; 25 July – 14 August 1944; 32nd U-boat Flotilla; 15 August 1944 – 31 January 1945; 11th U-boat Flotilla; 1 February – 8 May 1945
- Identification codes: M 41 384
- Commanders: Lt.z.S. / Oblt.z.S. Hans-Heinrich Haß; 25 July 1944 – February 1945; Kptlt. Konstantin von Rappard; March – 9 May 1945
- Operations: 2 patrols: 1st patrol: a. 29 January – 25 February 1945; b. 30 – 31 March 1945; 2nd patrol: 2 April – 8 May 1945
- Victories: None

German submarine U-2324 was a highly advanced submarine built for Nazi Germany's Kriegsmarine in World War II. U-2324 was one of the last commissioned boats to undertake an operational patrol, and one of just three of her class to undergo two. During these patrols, she succeeded in sinking a single small British coastal freighter, one of just five ships sunk by this submarine class.

U-2321 was built as a Type XXIII submarine at Hamburg during the spring of 1944. As an early production of a new class of boats which utilised new technologies, she required a lengthy period of sea trials and training to best develop the boat's offensive capabilities. It was thus not until January 1945 that her captain, Oberleutnant zur See Hans-Heinrich Haß, was permitted to take her on a patrol off the Eastern coast of Scotland.

== Design ==
Like all Type XXIII U-boats, U-2324 had a displacement of 234 tonnes (230 long tons) when at the surface and 258 tonnes (254 long tons) while submerged. She had a total length of 34.68 m (113 ft 9 in) (o/a), a beam width of 3.02 m (9 ft 11 in) (o/a), and a draught depth of 3.66 m (12 ft). The submarine was powered by one MWM six-cylinder RS134S diesel engine providing 575–630 metric horsepower (423–463 kilowatts; 567–621 shaft horsepower), one AEG GU4463-8 double-acting electric motor electric motor providing 580 PS (430 kW; 570 shp), and one BBC silent running CCR188 electric motor providing 35 PS (26 kW; 35 shp).

The submarine had a maximum surface speed of 9.7 knots (18.0 km/h; 11.2 mph) and a submerged speed of 12.5 knots (23.2 km/h; 14.4 mph). When submerged, the boat could operate at 4 knots (7.4 km/h; 4.6 mph) for 194 nautical miles (359 km; 223 mi); when surfaced, she could travel 2,600 nautical miles (4,800 km; 3,000 mi) at 8 knots (15 km/h; 9.2 mph). U-2324 was fitted with two 53.3 cm (21 in) torpedo tubes in the bow. She could carry two preloaded torpedoes. The complement was 14–18 men. This class of U-boat did not carry a deck gun.

== Service history ==
The first patrol was unsuccessful, Allied precautions and counter-measures were effective enough to prevent her from successfully targeting even the small coastal vessels to be found in this area. She returned empty-handed, and Haß was replaced by Kapitänleutnant Konstantin von Rappard, who now commanded her for the remainder of her service career.

The second patrol was also unsuccessful. U-2324 returned to Stavanger in May 1945 the day before the surrender. When Germany surrendered, U-2324 was at Stavanger in Norway, from where it sailed to Loch Ryan in Scotland for disposal in Operation Deadlight. Towed out to sea on the 27 November, the boat was destroyed as a naval gunnery target.

== Bibliography ==
- Busch, Rainer; Röll, Hans-Joachim (1999). German U-boat commanders of World War II : a biographical dictionary. Translated by Brooks, Geoffrey. London, Annapolis, Md: Greenhill Books, Naval Institute Press. ISBN 1-55750-186-6.
- Busch, Rainer; Röll, Hans-Joachim (1999). Deutsche U-Boot-Verluste von September 1939 bis Mai 1945 [German U-boat losses from September 1939 to May 1945]. Der U-Boot-Krieg (in German). Vol. IV. Hamburg, Berlin, Bonn: Mittler. ISBN 3-8132-0514-2.
- Gröner, Erich; Jung, Dieter; Maass, Martin (1991). U-boats and Mine Warfare Vessels. German Warships 1815–1945. Vol. 2. Translated by Thomas, Keith; Magowan, Rachel. London: Conway Maritime Press. ISBN 0-85177-593-4.
- Sharpe, Peter (1998). U-Boat Fact File. Great Britain: Midland Publishing. ISBN 1-85780-072-9.
