= Gelting Bay =

Coordinates: 54.78°N 9.85°E

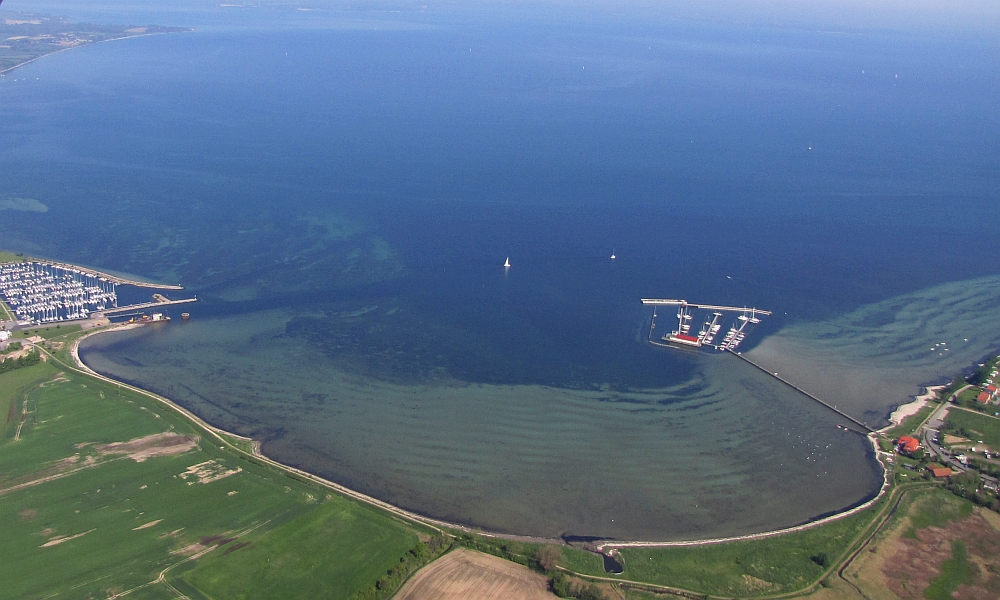
2012 aerial photograph of Gelting Bay from the south with Gelting Mole (far left) and Wackerballig (right) and the spit near Habernis on the Flensburg Fjord (top left)

Gelting Bay (German: Geltinger Bucht, Danish: Gelting Bugt), sometimes also the Bay of Gelting, is a bight of the Baltic Sea on the northeastern coast of the region of Anglia at the exit to the Flensburg Fjord near the town of Gelting. The bay extends from Habernis in the northwest via Wackerballig to the south to the nature reserve of Geltinger Birk in the east. The length of the shoreline along the bay is about 15 kilometres. There are currently no commercial shipping routes across the bay.

The coastal region belongs to the district of Geltinger Bucht with its head office in Steinbergkirche. The land around Gelting Bay is dominated by agriculture and tourism, the bay itself by sailing and some fishing.

== U-boat scuttling (Operation Regenbogen) ==
During the night of 4/5 May 1945, 47 U-boats of the Kriegsmarine were scuttled in Gelting Bay by their crews in accordance with long-standing orders, known as Operation Regenbogen, in order to prevent them falling into the hands of their enemies, the Allies. This happened despite the order being revoked on the evening of 4 may by Grand Admiral Dönitz.

== Ferry service across Gelting Bay ==
Between 1 August 1965 and 30 June 1999 there was a ferry service between Faaborg, on Fyn in Denmark, and Germany, with ferry lines running across Gelting Bay to Gelting Mole. Since the ferry distance was 28 nautical miles and led outside the then territorial waters, the shipping company assumed a business model which, in addition to the ferry service and the management of fast restaurants and cafeterias, had a substantial sale of goods at tax-free prices. These so-called "butter cruises" (Butterfahrten) contributed to a tourist boom around Gelting Bay. According to a decision by the European Union (EU) to stop the duty-free sales of goods within EU countries, not only did sales on board the ferry decline, but so did the number of passengers on the so-called butter cruises. The shipping company that ran the Faaborg - Gelting Mole Line therefore discontinued the ferry service on Gelting Bay on 30 June 1999 due to its lack of profitability. Some of the technical facilities of the Gelting Mole landing stage have since been dismantled.

== Anchorage ==
During the oil crisis, between 1975 and 1979, up to 14 supertankers used Gelting Bay as an anchorage. These vessels were laid up for a period of time because they had no orders or few freight rates. Some tankers like the Wilhelmine Essberger were even laid up at the Howaldtswerke-Deutsche Werft shipyard in Kiel immediately after being launched. Gelting Bay is particularly well suited as an anchorage for laid-up ships due to its geographic location and shallow limestone seabed (marked by a lighthouse); it also is a sufficient water depth for ships of 140 to 300 metres in length. Resupply to the ships was easily carried out from the nearby port of Gelting. During the oil crisis, these laid-up ships became a tourist attraction, which brought additional income to the restaurants and hotels of the region.

== See also ==
- Bernhard Asmussen: Geltinger Bucht - Projekte und Proteste (Der Sündenfall: Die Nordstraße / Fährhafen Gelting-Mole - Aus und vorbei / Öltanker im Wartestand - Tankerfriedhof Geltinger Bucht / Betonwerft: Tanker für die Ewigkeit / Olympia- und Sportboothafen Gelting-Mole / Hafendorf Niesholm - Wohnen am Wasser) in: Jahrbuch des Heimatvereins der Landschaft Angeln 2009
- Bernhard Asmussen: Kalkgrund - Feuerschiff und Leuchtturm in der Geltinger Bucht, in: Jahrbuch des Heimatvereins der Landschaft Angeln 2013
