= Gelting =

- Municipality
- Coat of arms

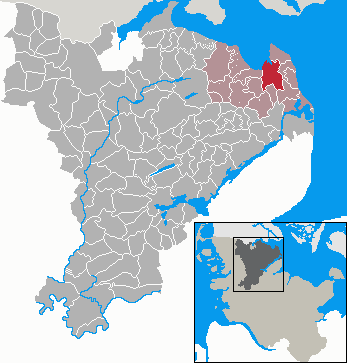
- Location of Gelting within Schleswig-Flensburg district
- Interactive map of Gelting
- Location within Germany Location within Schleswig-Holstein
- Coordinates: 54°45′N 9°54′E
- Country: Germany
- State: Schleswig-Holstein
- District: Schleswig-Flensburg
- Municipal assoc.: Geltinger Bucht

Government
  - Mayor: Boris Kratz

Area
  - Total: 19.92 km^{2} (7.69 sq mi)
- Elevation: 17 m (56 ft)

Population (2025-12-31)
  - Total: 2,316
  - Density: 116.3/km^{2} (301.1/sq mi)
- Time zone: UTC+01:00 (CET)
  - Summer (DST): UTC+02:00 (CEST)
- Postal codes: 24395
- Dialling codes: 04643
- Vehicle registration: SL
- Website: www.gelting.de

Gelting is a municipality in the district of Schleswig-Flensburg, in Schleswig-Holstein, Germany. It is situated near the Baltic Sea, approx. 33 km northeast of Schleswig, and 30 km east of Flensburg.

Gelting is part of the Amt ("collective municipality") Geltinger Bucht.

== Shield or Coat of Arms ==
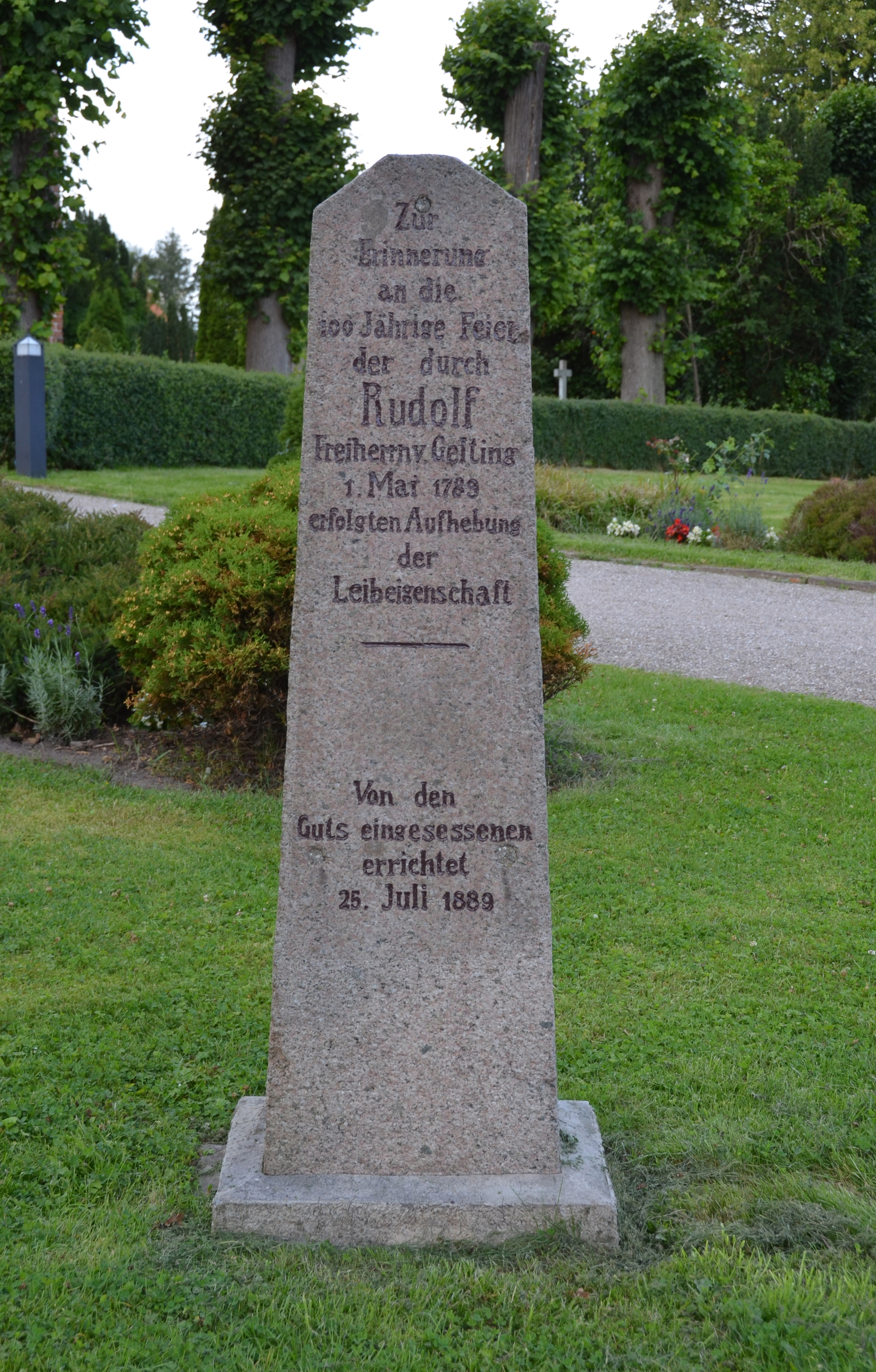
St. Katharinen in Gelting, Schleswig Holstein

Heraldic Description: "The coat of arms is blue under a radiant golden half sun a golden plow with a silver ploughshare."

== Gelting Personalities ==
- Detlev von Ahlefeldt (1612–1686), Military officer, War Commissioner for the Danish King
- Seneca Freiherr von Gelting (1715-1786), regional landowner
- Hermann Bendix Todsen (1864–1946), Mayor of Flensburg
- Herbert Kortum (1907–1979), Scientist; computer scientist and DDR computer pioneer
- Vera Dietz Motika (1936-2020) singer and performer; emigrated to Columbus, Ohio, USA. By the act of emigration, she gave up all chance to obtain a European title.
