= German submarine U-2367 =

German World War II submarine

- Postwar photo of Hecht (S-171), (former Type XXIII submarine U-2367).

History

Nazi Germany
- Name: U-2367
- Ordered: 20 September 1944
- Builder: Deutsche Werft AG, Hamburg
- Yard number: 521
- Laid down: 11 December 1944
- Launched: 23 February 1945
- Commissioned: 17 March 1945
- Fate: Sunk on 5 May 1945; Raised in August 1956

West Germany
- Name: Hecht
- Namesake: Pike
- Commissioned: 1 October 1957
- Stricken: 30 September 1968
- Identification: Pennant number:S 171
- Fate: Broken up in 1969

General characteristics
- Class & type: Type XXIII submarine
- Displacement: 234 t (230 long tons) (surfaced); 258 t (254 long tons) (submerged)
- Length: 34.68 m (113 ft 9 in) (o/a); 26.00 m (85 ft 4 in) (p/h)
- Beam: 3.02 m (9 ft 11 in) (o/a); 3.00 m (9 ft 10 in) (p/h)
- Draught: 3.66 m (12 ft)
- Installed power: 575–630 PS (423–463 kW; 567–621 shp) (diesel drive); 580 PS (430 kW; 570 shp) (standard electric drive); 35 PS (26 kW; 35 shp) (silent electric drive)
- Propulsion: 1 × MWM RS134S 6-cylinder diesel engine; 1 × AEG GU4463-8 double-acting electric motor; 1 × BBC CCR188 electric creeping motor
- Speed: 9.7 knots (18 km/h; 11 mph) (surfaced); 12.5 knots (23 km/h; 14 mph) (submerged)
- Range: 2,600 nautical miles (4,800 km; 3,000 mi) at 8 knots (15 km/h; 9.2 mph) surfaced; 194 nmi (359 km; 223 mi) at 4 knots (7.4 km/h; 4.6 mph) submerged
- Test depth: 180 m (590 ft)
- Complement: 14–18
- Armament: 2 × 53.3 cm (21 in) bow torpedo tubes; 2 × torpedoes

Service record (Kriegsmarine)
- Part of: 4th U-boat Flotilla; 17 March – 5 May 1945
- Identification codes: M 51 402
- Commanders: Oblt.z.S. Heinrich Schröder; 17 March – 9 May 1945
- Operations: None
- Victories: None

German submarine U-2367 was a Type XXIII U-boat of Nazi Germany's Kriegsmarine during World War II. She was ordered on 20 September 1944, and was laid down on 11 December 1944 at Deutsche Werft AG, Hamburg, as yard number 521. She was launched on 23 February 1945 and commissioned under the command of Oberleutnant zur See Heinrich Schröder on 17 March 1945.

== Design ==
Like all Type XXIII U-boats, U-2367 had a displacement of 234 tonnes (230 long tons) when at the surface and 258 tonnes (254 long tons) while submerged. She had a total length of 34.68 m (113 ft 9 in) (o/a), a beam width of 3.02 m (9 ft 11 in) (o/a), and a draught depth of3.66 m (12 ft). The submarine was powered by one MWM six-cylinder RS134S diesel engine providing 575–630 metric horsepower (423–463 kilowatts; 567–621 shaft horsepower), one AEG GU4463-8 double-acting electric motor electric motor providing 580 PS (430 kW; 570 shp), and one BBC silent running CCR188 electric motor providing 35 PS (26 kW; 35 shp).

The submarine had a maximum surface speed of 9.7 knots (18.0 km/h; 11.2 mph) and a submerged speed of 12.5 knots (23.2 km/h; 14.4 mph). When submerged, the boat could operate at 4 knots (7.4 km/h; 4.6 mph) for 194 nautical miles (359 km; 223 mi); when surfaced, she could travel 2,600 nautical miles (4,800 km; 3,000 mi) at 8 knots (15 km/h; 9.2 mph). U-2367 was fitted with two 53.3 cm (21 in) torpedo tubes in the bow. She could carry two preloaded torpedoes. The complement was 14 – 18 men. This class of U-boat did not carry a deck gun.

== Service history ==
On 5 May 1945, U-2367 sank near Schleimünde after a collision with another unidentified German U-boat.

The wreck was originally located at 55°00′N 11°00′E.

== Post war service ==
In August 1956, U-2367 was raised by the German Federal Navy and commissioned Hecht on 1 October 1957. On 30 September 1968, she was struck from the navy list and then broken up in Kiel in 1969.

== See also ==
- Battle of the Atlantic

== Bibliography ==
- Busch, Rainer; Röll, Hans-Joachim (1999). German U-boat commanders of World War II : a biographical dictionary. Translated by Brooks, Geoffrey. London, Annapolis, Md: Greenhill Books, Naval Institute Press. ISBN 1-55750-186-6.
- Gröner, Erich; Jung, Dieter; Maass, Martin (1991). U-boats and Mine Warfare Vessels. German Warships 1815–1945. Vol. 2. Translated by Thomas, Keith; Magowan, Rachel. London: Conway Maritime Press. ISBN 0-85177-593-4.
- Williamson, Gordon (2005). Wolf Pack: The Story of the U-boat in World War II. Osprey. ISBN 1841768723.
