= Gordon Williamson (military author) =

British military historian and author

- Born: 1951 (age 74–75)
- Occupation: Author
- Known for: Military history

Gordon Williamson (born 1951) is a military history writer and author based in the United Kingdom. Williamson spent seven years with the Military Police in the British Territorial Army and, as of 2016, resides in Scotland. Williamson has written many books and other publications. Williamson's works focus primarily on German military forces during the Second World War.

Williamson has worked with several publishers, but is perhaps best known for his continuing partnership with Osprey Publishing, with whom he has produced over 40 books.

== Selected works ==
- U-boats of the Kaiser's Navy
- E-BOAT vs. MTB: The English Channel 1941–45
- German Commanders of World War II (2): Waffen-SS, Luftwaffe and Navy
- Knight's Cross with Diamonds Recipients: 1941–45
- Grey Wolf: U-Boat Crewman of World War II
- The Iron Cross
- Osprey Men-at-Arms 434, World War II German Police Units
- Kriegsmarine U-boats 1939–45
- Loyalty Is My Honor: Waffen-SS Soldiers Talking
- The SS: Hitler's Instrument of Terror
- Waffen-SS Handbook
- World War II German Battle Insignia
- Torpedo Los!: The Fascinating World of U-boat Collectibles
