= German ship Rhein =

Elbe-class replenishment ship

- Rhein on 8 May 2026 in Hamburg

History

Germany
- Name: Rhein
- Namesake: Rhein
- Builder: Flensburger Schiffbau-Gesellschaft
- Laid down: 7 October 1992
- Launched: 11 March 1993
- Commissioned: 1 September 1993
- Home port: Kiel
- Identification: MMSI number: 211211500; Callsign: DRHL; Pennant number: A513
- Status: Active

General characteristics
- Type: Elbe-class replenishment ship
- Displacement: 3,586 tonnes
- Length: 100.55 m (329 ft 11 in)
- Beam: 15.40 m (50 ft 6 in)
- Draft: 4.05 m (13 ft 3 in)
- Propulsion: 1 × Deutz-MWM SBV diesel engines; 2,562 kW, Bow thruster
- Speed: 15 knots (28 km/h)
- Range: 2,600 nmi (4,800 km)
- Capacity: 24 standard 6.2 m containers (maximum); Supplies: 700 m³ fuel; 60 m³ aviation (helicopter) fuel; 280 m³ fresh water; 160 tonnes ammunition; 40 tonnes supplies; Disposal: 5 tonnes solid waste; 180 m³ waste water; 32 m³ waste oil
- Complement: 40 (standard) + >38 (repair party, passengers, squadron staff)
- Armament: 2 × Fliegerfaust 2 surface-to-air missile stands (MANPADS); 2 × Rheinmetall Rh202 20 mm autocannon; being replaced by 2 × MLG-27 27 mm remote controlled autocannons
- Aviation facilities: Helipad

Rhein (A513) is the third ship of the Elbe-class replenishment ships of the German Navy.

== Development ==
The Elbe-class replenishment ships are also known tenders of the German Navy. In German, this type of ship is called Versorgungsschiffe which can be translated as "supply ship" though the official translation in English is "replenishment ship".

They are intended to support German naval units away from their home ports. The ships carry fuel, provisions, ammunition and other matériel and also provide medical services. The ships are named after German rivers where German parliaments were placed.

== Construction and career ==
Rhein was launched in March 1993 in Flensburg, Germany. She was commissioned on 1 September 1993.

On 20 June 2018, Rhein left her home port of Kiel. The ship, which is part of the support squadron, will be the flagship of the Standing NATO Mine Countermeasures Group 2 (SNMCMG2) and the Black Sea for the next six months.

== Gallery ==
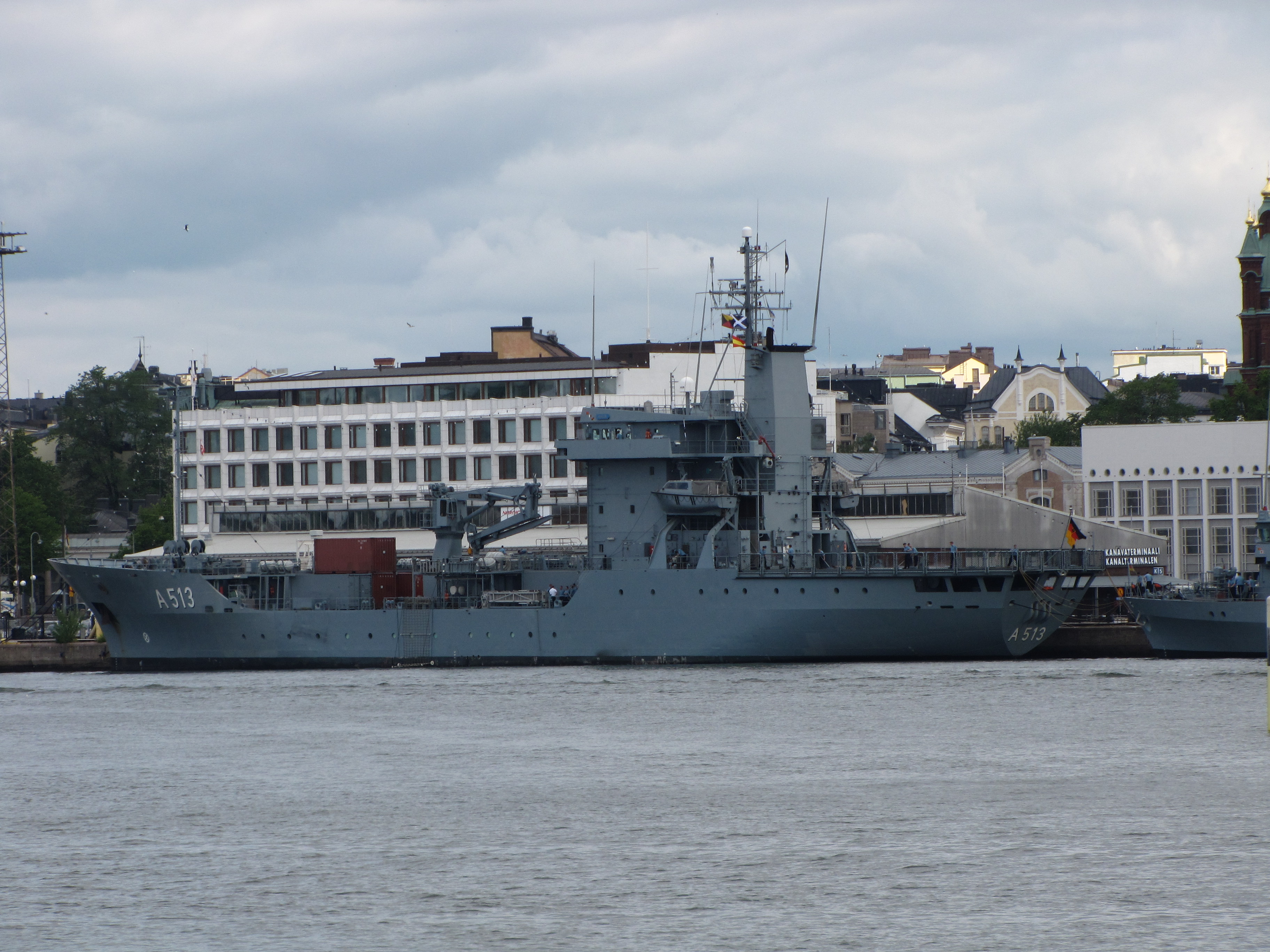
Rhein on 2 July 2010

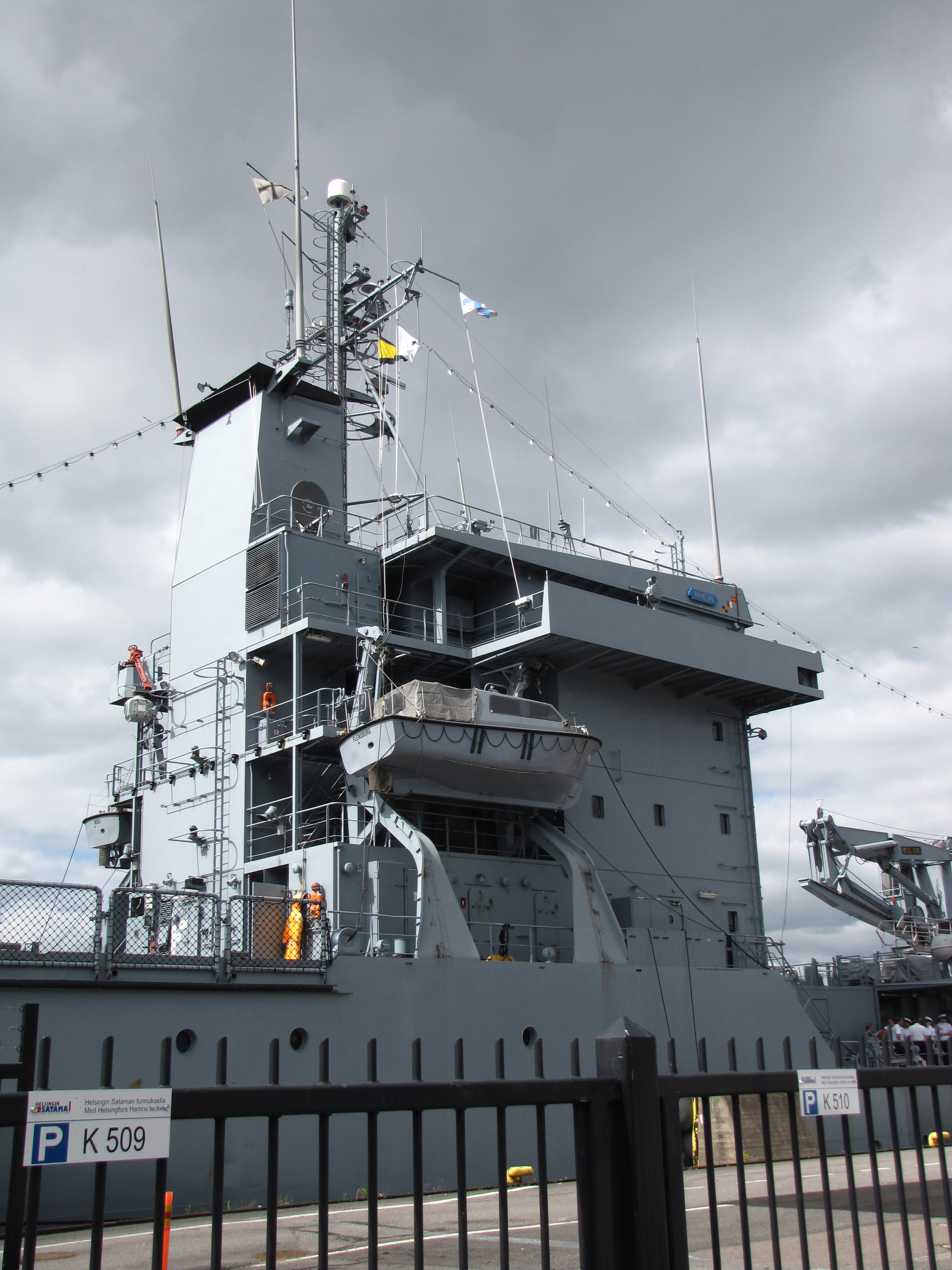
Rhein on 2 July 2010

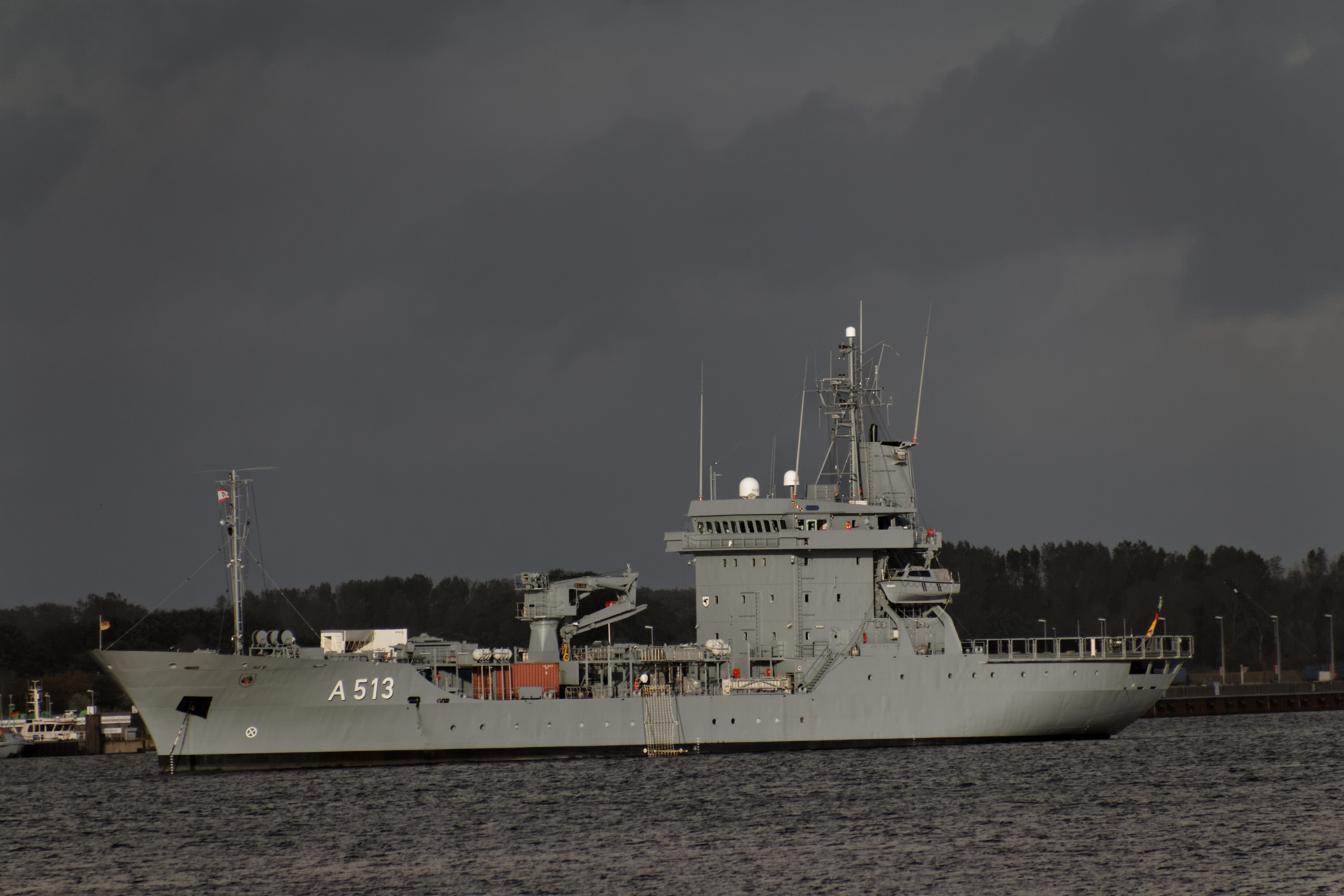
Rhein on 11 October 2011

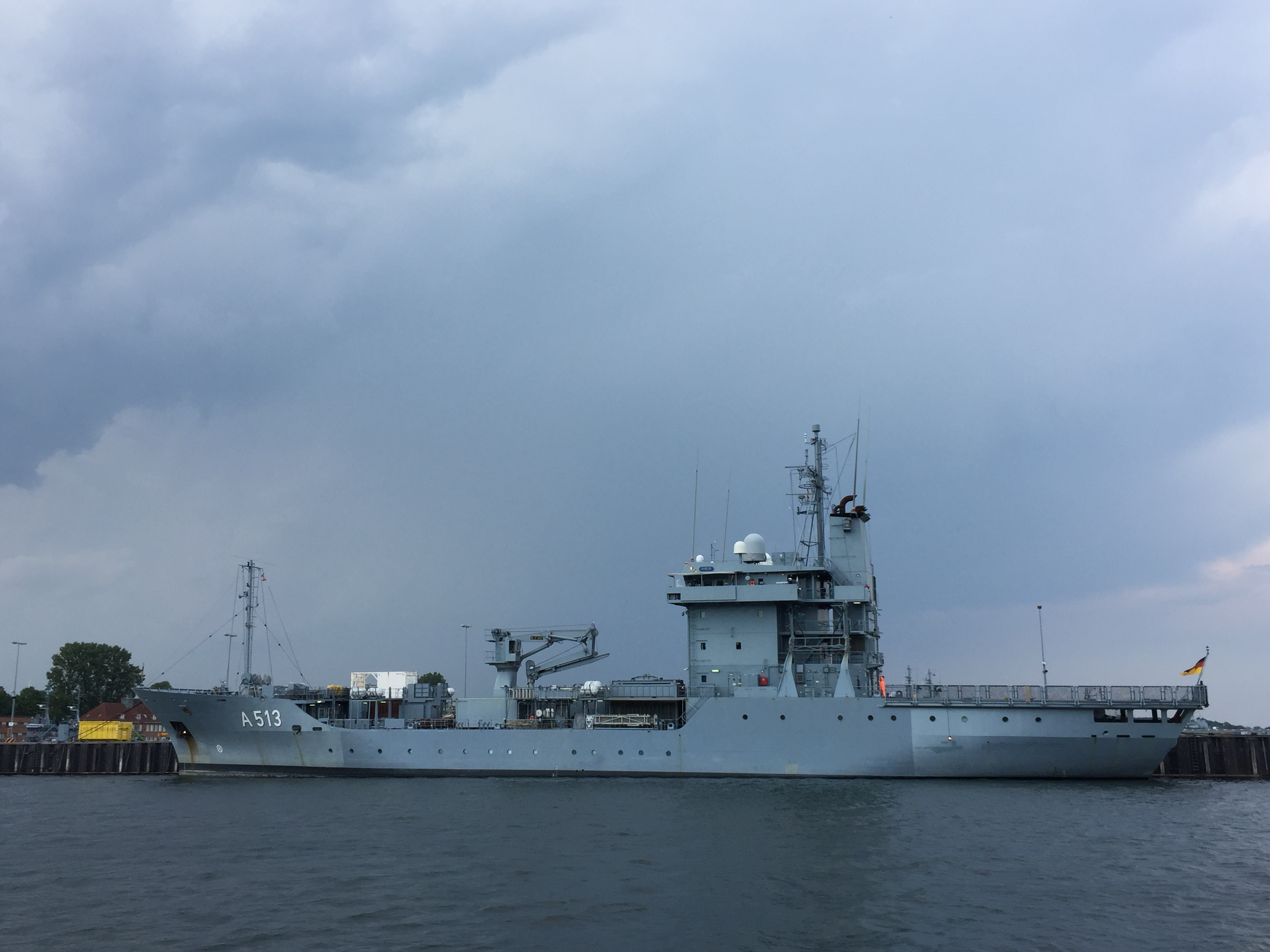
Rhein on 19 June 2019

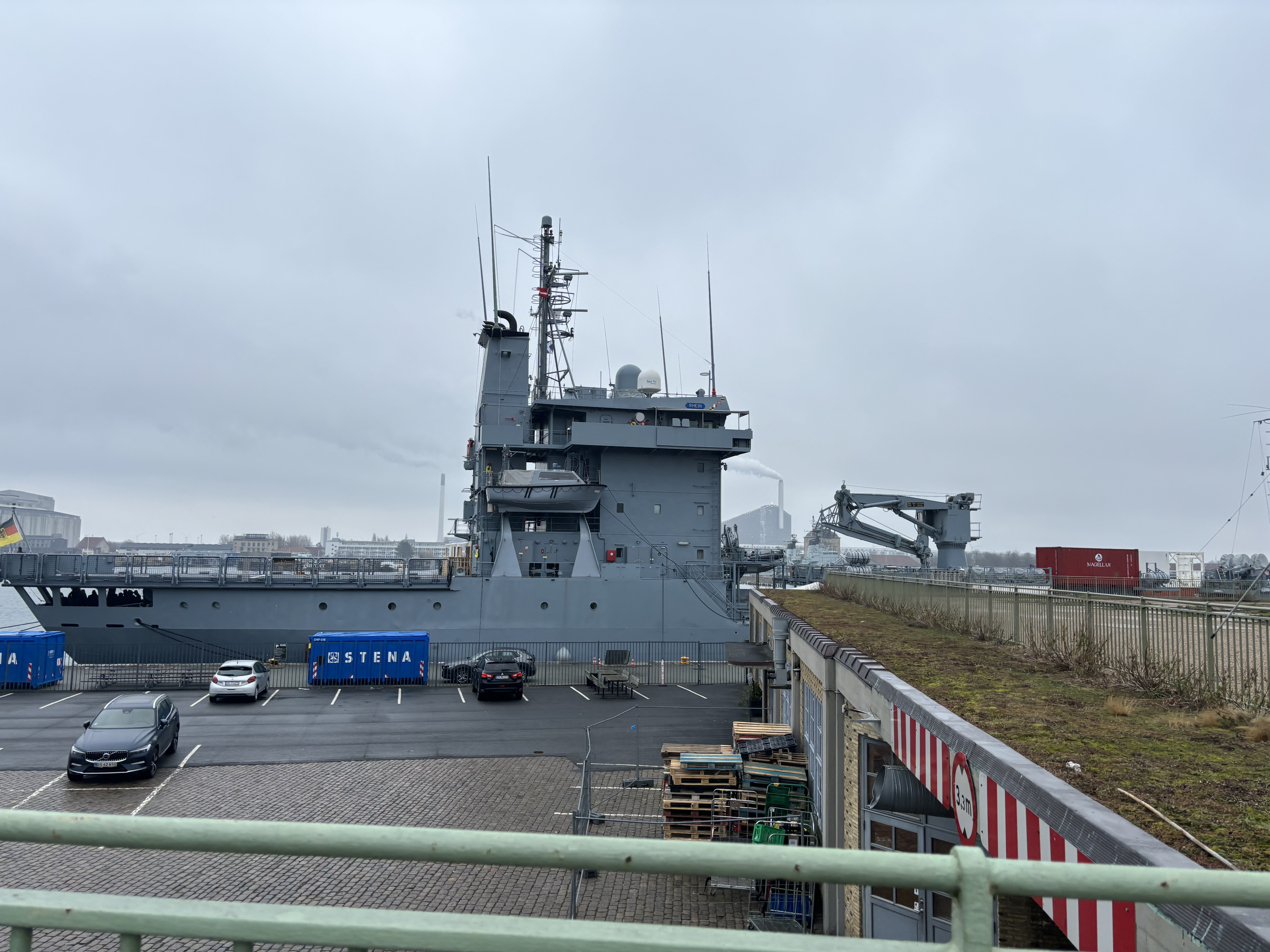
Rhein on 9 December 2023
