= German ship Main =

Elbe-class replenishment ship

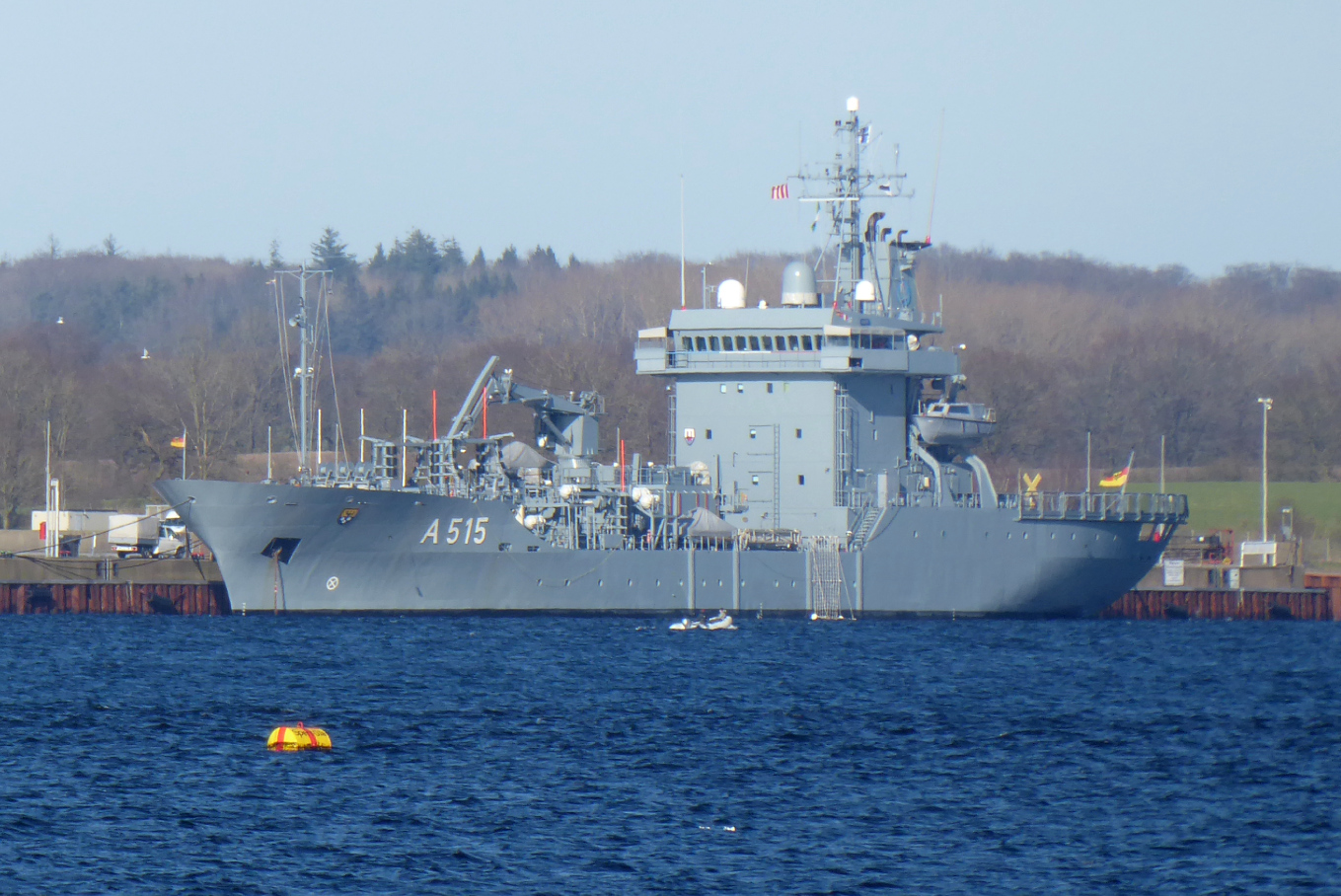
- Main on 14 March 2020

History

Germany
- Name: Main
- Namesake: Main
- Builder: Bremer Vulkan
- Launched: June 1993
- Commissioned: 10 June 1994
- Home port: Eckernförde
- Identification: MMSI number: 211210120; Callsign: DRHN; Pennant number: A515
- Status: Active

General characteristics
- Type: Elbe-class replenishment ship
- Displacement: 3,586 tonnes
- Length: 100.55 m (329 ft 11 in)
- Beam: 15.40 m (50 ft 6 in)
- Draft: 4.05 m (13 ft 3 in)
- Propulsion: 1 × Deutz-MWM SBV diesel engines; 2,562 kW, Bow thruster
- Speed: 15 knots (28 km/h)
- Range: 2,600 nmi (4,800 km)
- Capacity: 24 standard 6.2 m containers (maximum); Supplies: 700 m³ fuel; 60 m³ aviation (helicopter) fuel; 280 m³ fresh water; 160 tonnes ammunition; 40 tonnes supplies; Disposal: 5 tonnes solid waste; 180 m³ waste water; 32 m³ waste oil
- Complement: 40 (standard) + >38 (repair party, passengers, squadron staff)
- Armament: 2 × Fliegerfaust 2 surface-to-air missile stands (MANPADS); 2 × Rheinmetall Rh202 20 mm autocannon; being replaced by 2 × MLG-27 27 mm remote controlled autocannons
- Aviation facilities: Helipad

Main (A515) is the fifth ship of the Elbe-class replenishment ships of the German Navy.

== Development ==
The Elbe-class replenishment ships are also known as tenders of the German Navy. In German, this type of ship is called Versorgungsschiffe which can be translated as "supply ship" though the official translation in English is "replenishment ship".

They are intended to support German naval units away from their home ports. The ships carry fuel, provisions, ammunition and other matériel and also provide medical services. The ships are named after German rivers where German parliaments were placed.

== Construction and career ==
Main was launched in June 1993 in Bremen-Vegesack, Germany. She was commissioned on 10 June 1994.

Main returned to her home port in Eckernförde on 13 April 2017. In addition to their own on-board crew, doctors, military police, language mediators and an Austrian boarding team were also embarked, so that the crew comprised around 105 women and men.

== Gallery ==
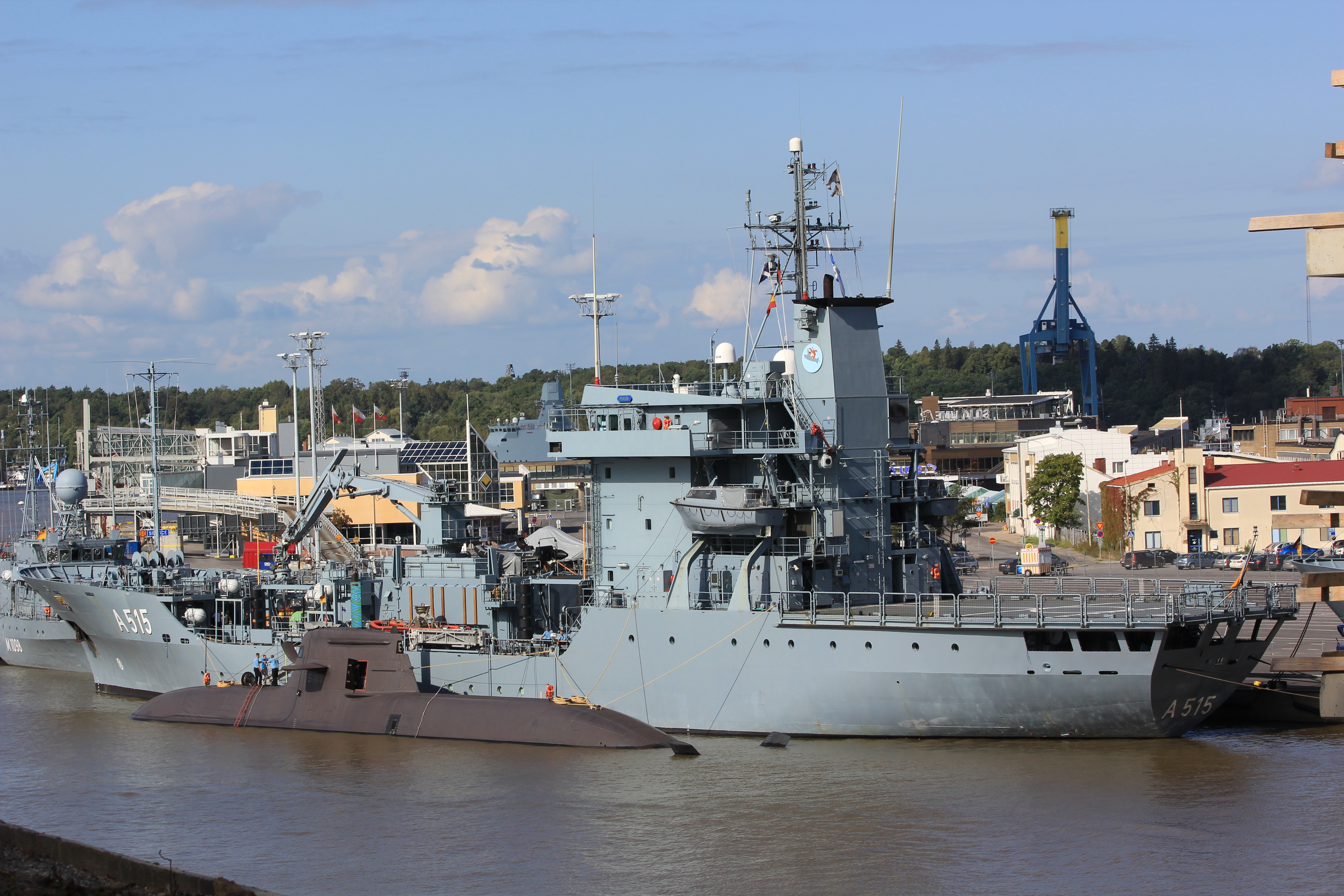
Main and U-33 on 31 August 2014

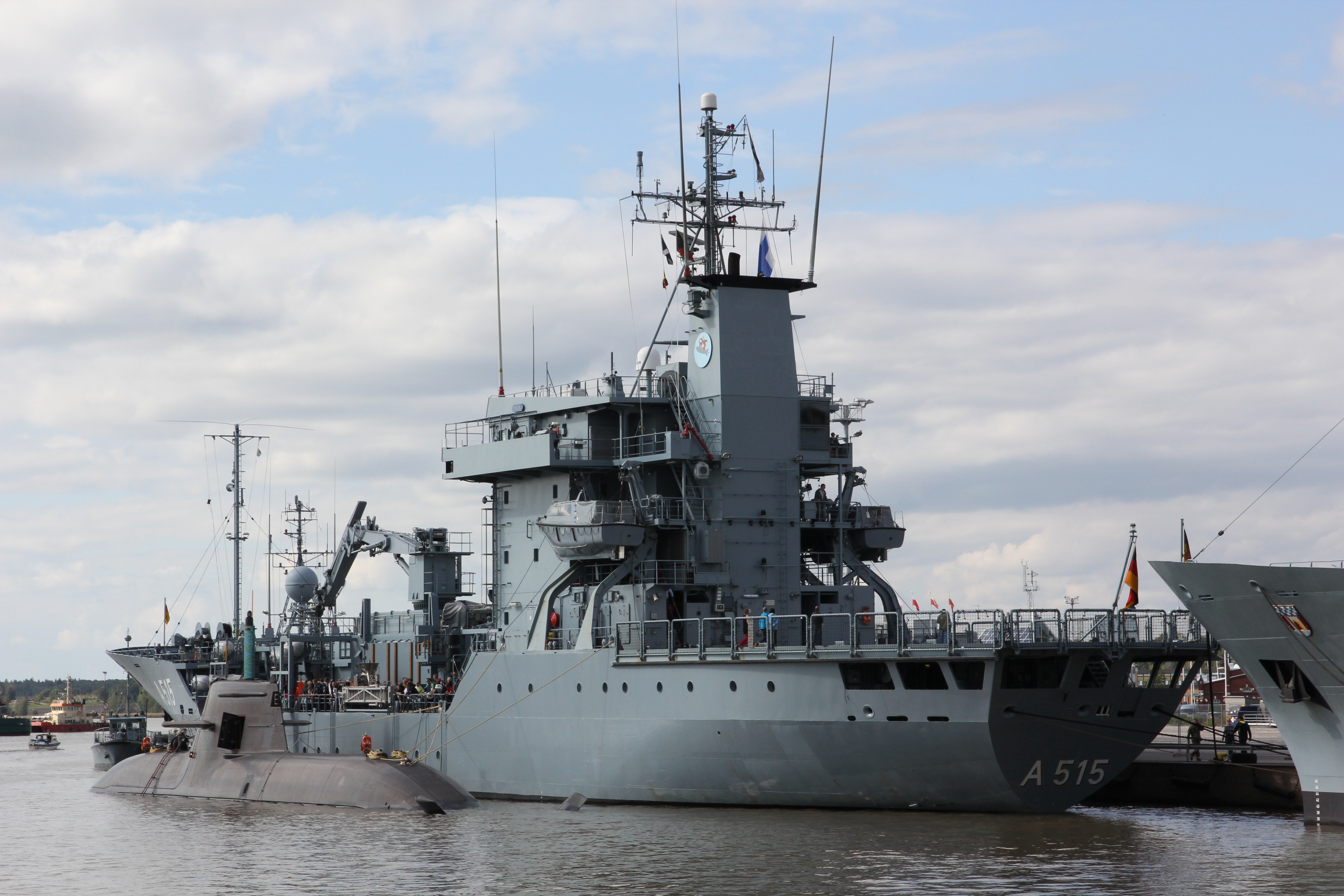

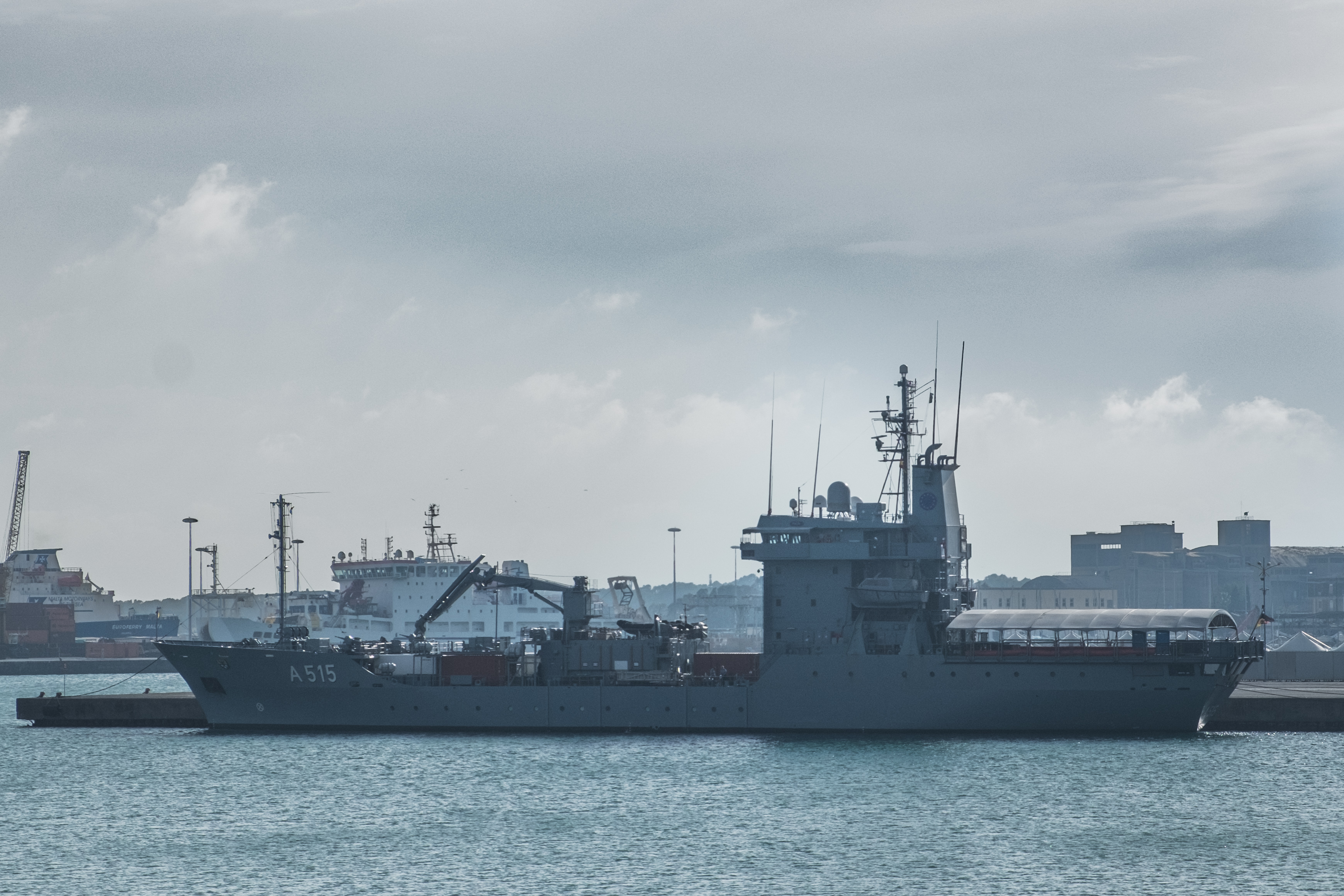
Main on 21 March 2017

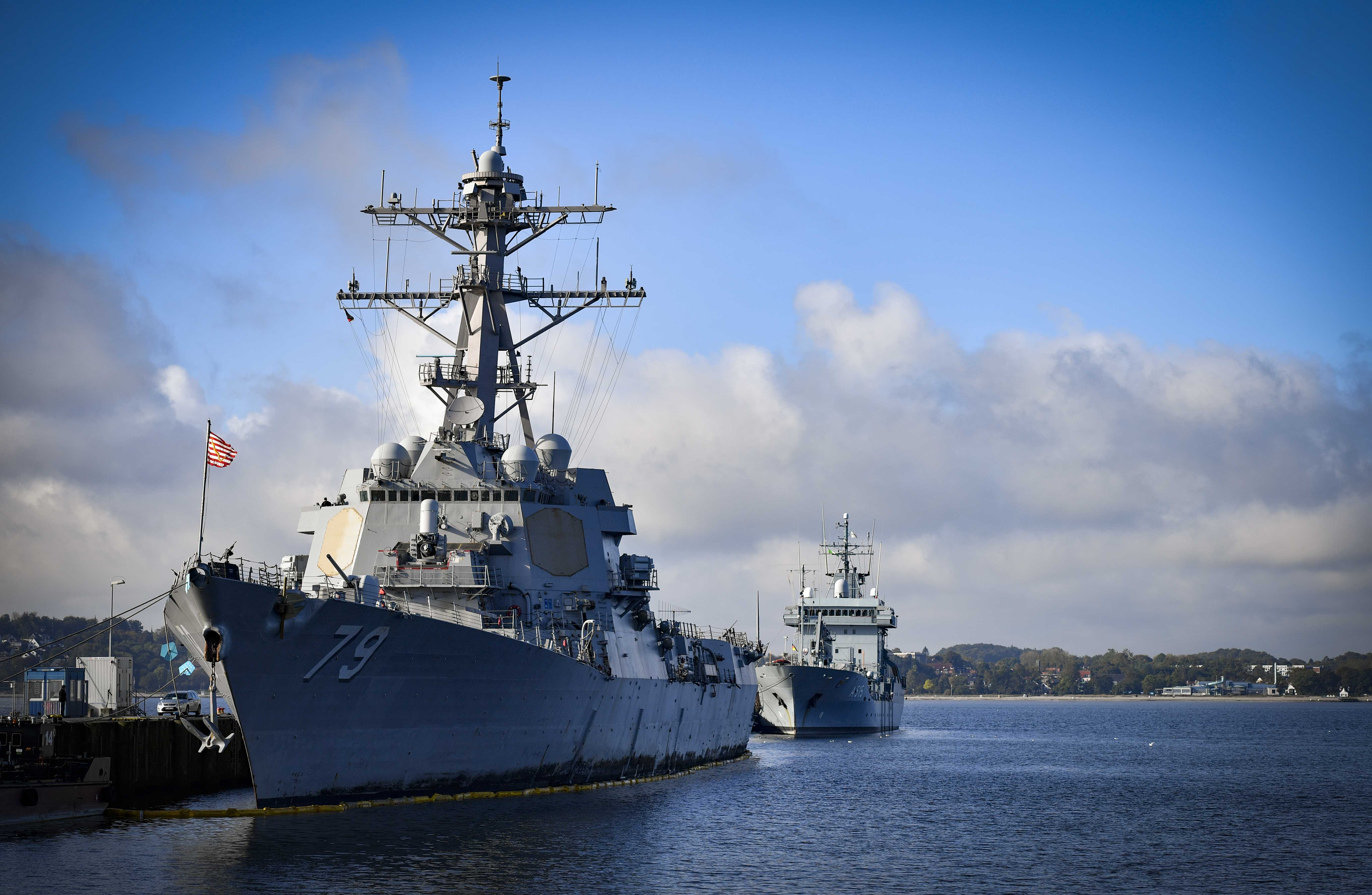
USS Oscar Austin and Main on 1 October 2017
