= Elbe-class replenishment ship =

German naval support ships

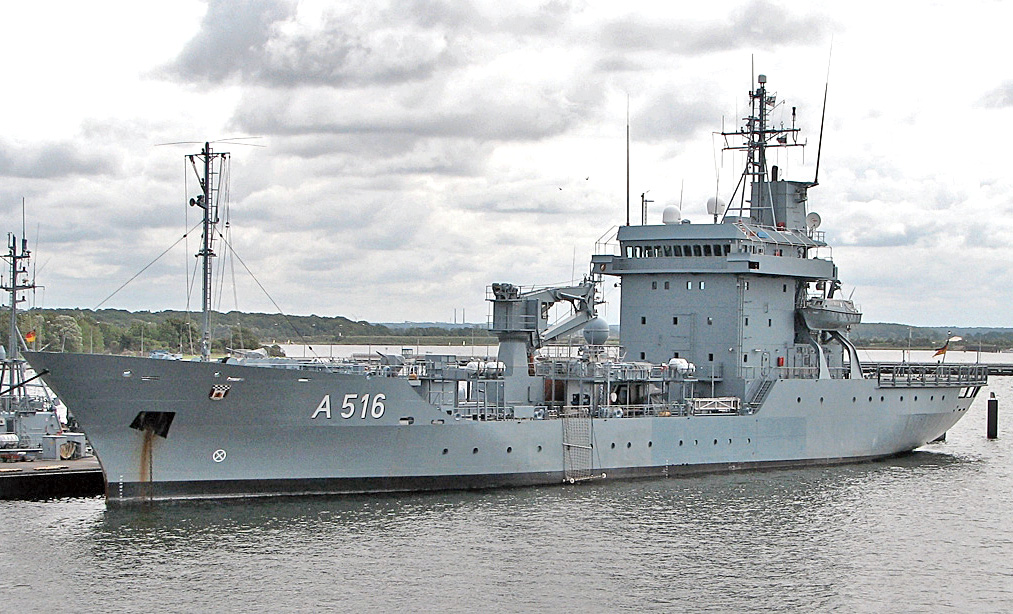
- Donau in Warnemünde

Class overview
- Name: Elbe class
- Builders: Bremer Vulkan
- Operators: German Navy
- Succeeded by: Berlin class
- In commission: 1993–present
- Completed: 6
- Active: 6

General characteristics
- Type: Replenishment ship
- Displacement: 3,586 tonnes
- Length: 100.55 m (329 ft 11 in)
- Beam: 15.40 m (50 ft 6 in)
- Draft: 4.05 m (13 ft 3 in)
- Propulsion: 1 × Deutz-MWM SBV diesel engines; 2,562 kW, Bow thruster
- Speed: 15 knots (28 km/h; 17 mph)
- Range: 2,600 nmi (4,800 km; 3,000 mi)
- Capacity: 24 standard 6.2 m containers (maximum); Supplies: 700 m³ fuel; 60 m³ aviation (helicopter) fuel; 280 m³ fresh water; 160 tonnes ammunition; 40 tonnes supplies; Disposal: 5 tonnes solid waste; 180 m³ waste water; 32 m³ waste oil
- Complement: 40 (standard) + >38 (repair party, passengers, squadron staff)
- Armament: 2 × Fliegerfaust 2 surface-to-air missile stands (MANPADS); 2 × Rheinmetall Rh202 20 mm autocannon; being replaced by 2 × MLG-27 27 mm remote controlled autocannons
- Aviation facilities: No hangar, but a heli deck was added for Sea King sized or larger helicopters

The Type 404 Elbe-class replenishment ships of the German Navy were built to support its squadrons of Fast Attack Craft, submarines and minesweeper/hunters, as such they are usually referred to as tenders.

The ships carry fuel, fresh water, food, ammunition and other matériel. They also have a medical station aboard but doctors are not part of their standard complement and will have to be flown in. The tenders also manage waste disposal for the ships they support at sea and can carry out minor repairs of assigned ships. For this purpose Elbe-class tenders assigned to fast attack craft squadrons, for example, carry the SUG repair and support shop specialized for these boats on their deck in a set of 13 standard containers.

Extensive communication gear and accommodations enable them to serve as squadron flagship.

While in general all Elbe-class tenders are quickly configurable to be reassigned to support other squadrons, one of the six ships is usually modified to support German submarines - carrying batteries for reloading for example. This ship - currently Main - while still being of the same class, and easily reconfigurable - is often named as a separate "sub-class" due to this larger modification.

== List of ships ==
Pennant number	Name	Call sign	Commissioned	Base	Unit
A511	Elbe	DRHJ	28 January 1993	Warnemünde	7th FAC squadron
A512	Mosel	DRHK	1 July 1993	Kiel	5th Minesweeper squadron
A513	Rhein	DRHL	1 September 1993	Kiel	3rd Minesweeper squadron
A514	Werra	DRHM	9 December 1993	Kiel	3rd Minesweeper squadron
A515	Main	DRHN	10 June 1994	Eckernförde	1st Submarine squadron
A516	Donau	DRHO	15 November 1994	Warnemünde	1st Corvette squadron

The ships were named after German rivers.

== Gallery ==
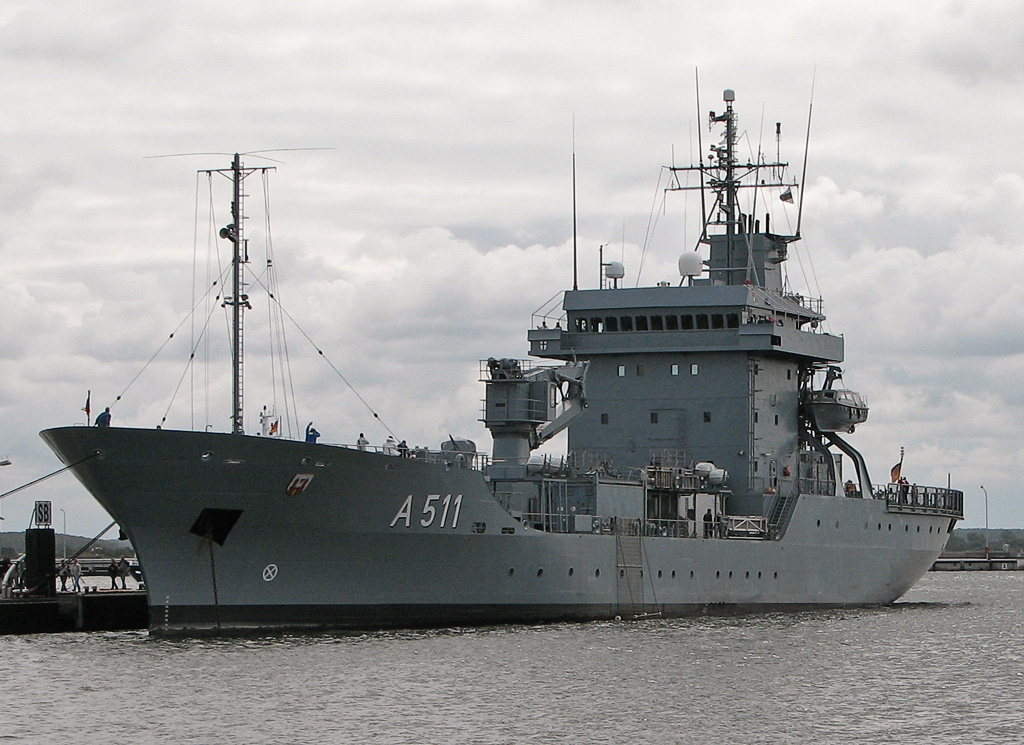
Tender Elbe in Warnemünde.

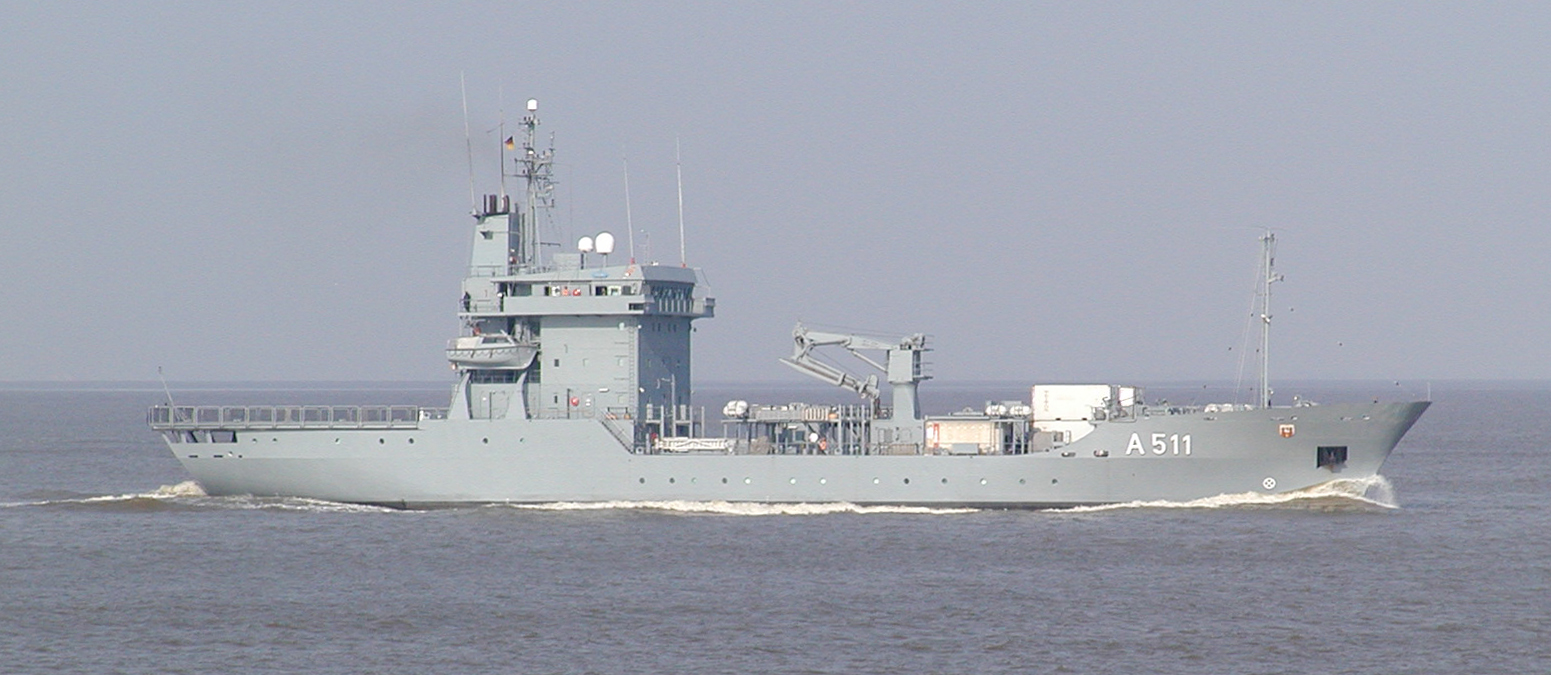
Tender Elbe.

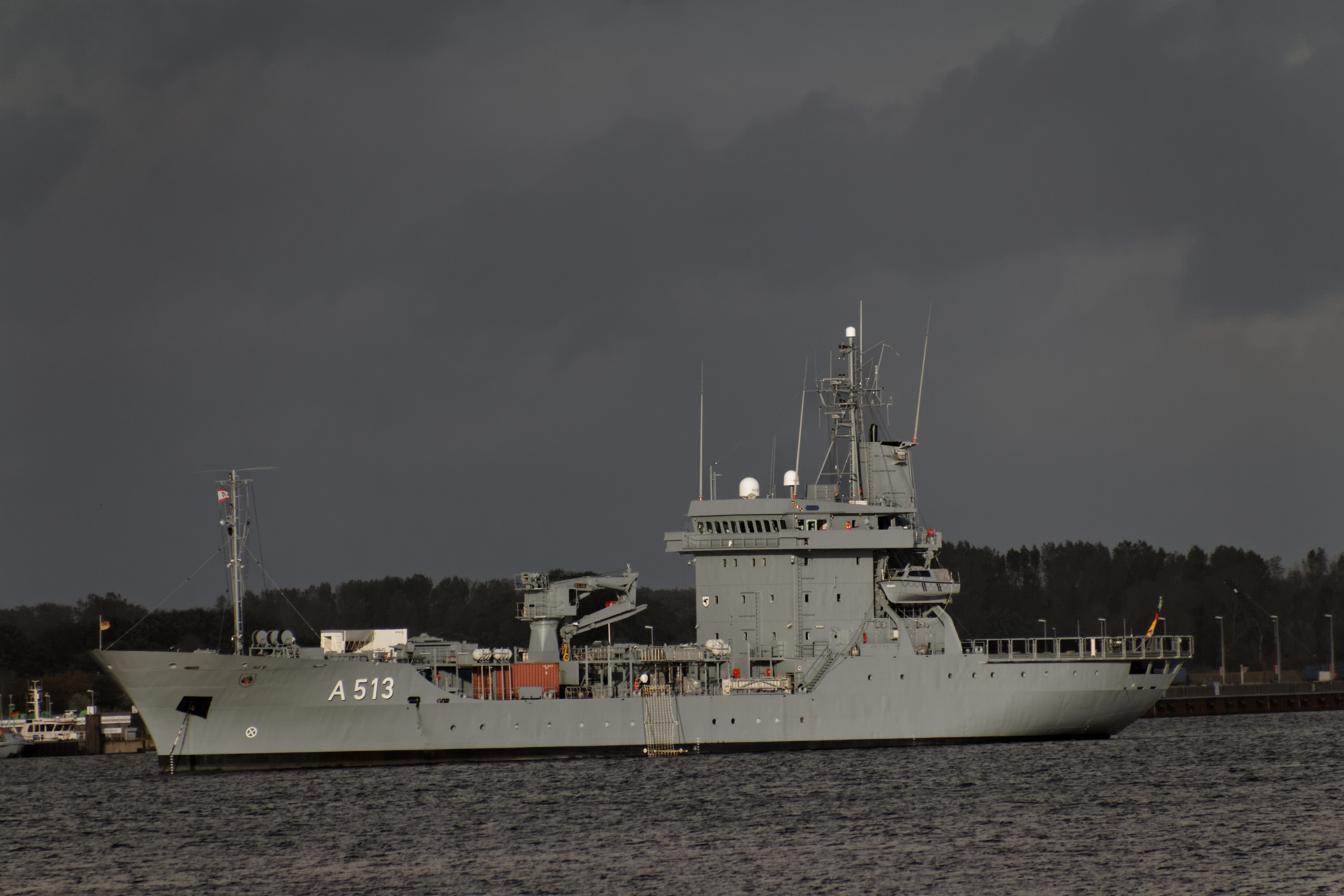
Tender Rhein in Eckernförde

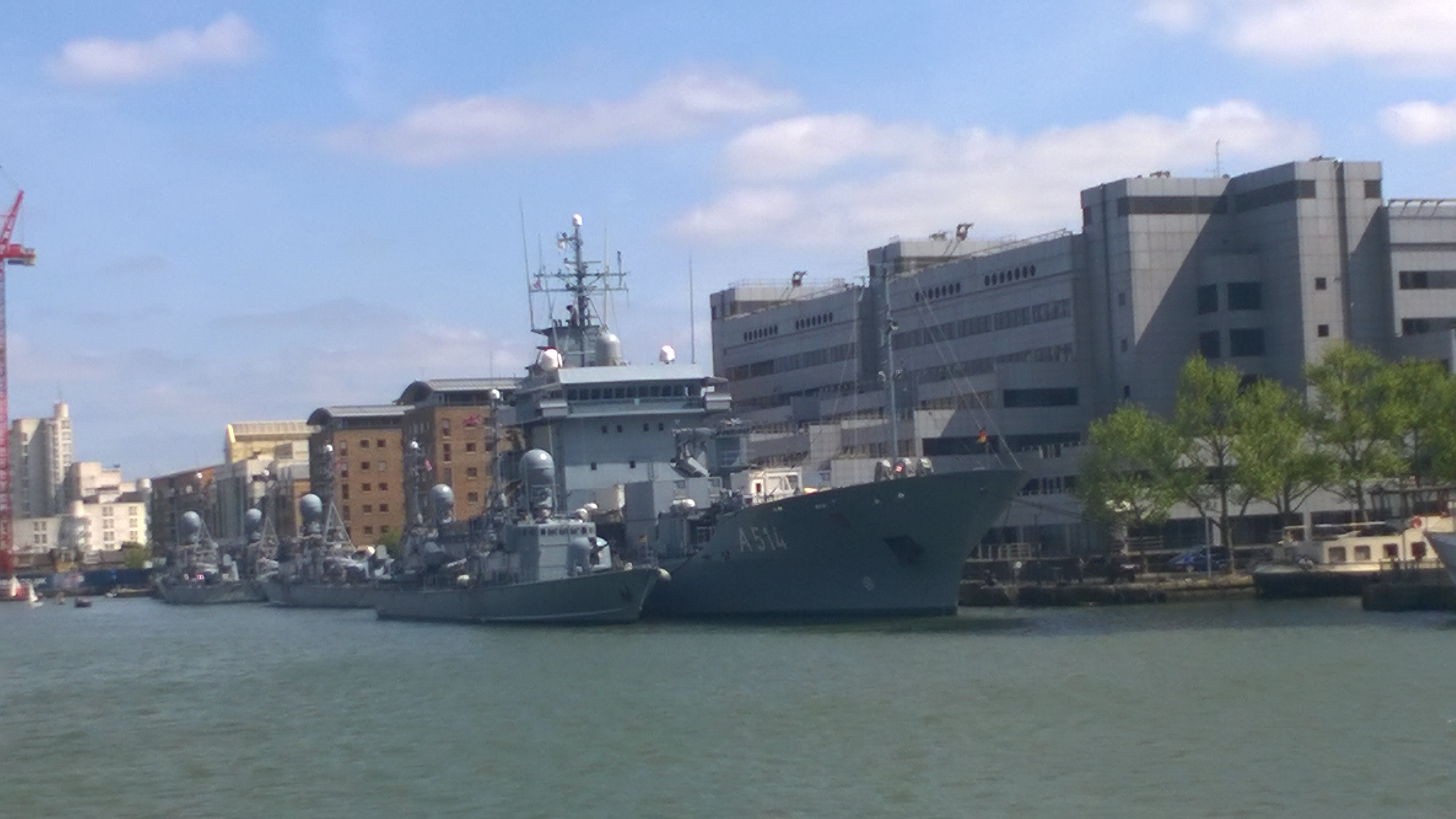
Werra in London

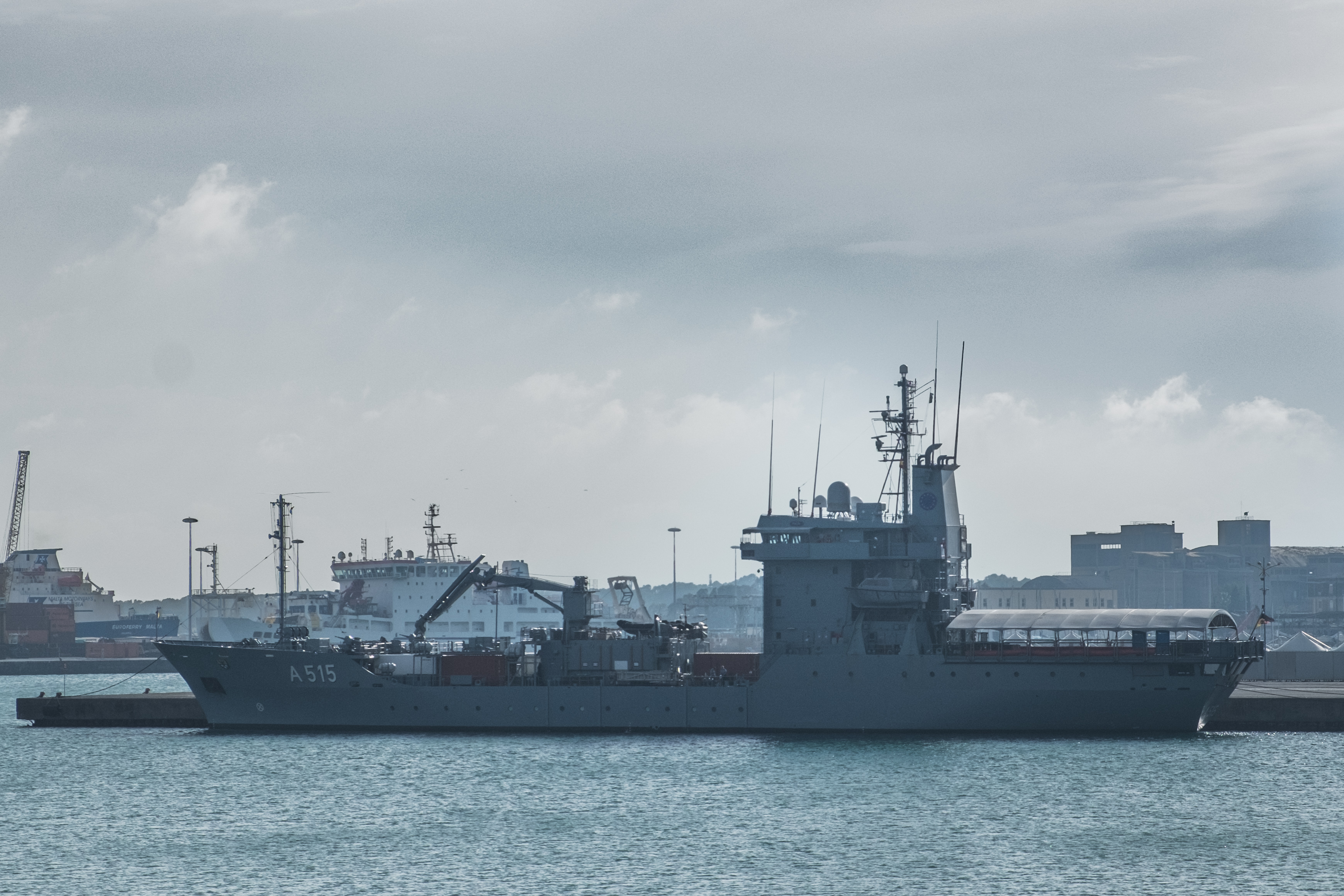
Main in Catania

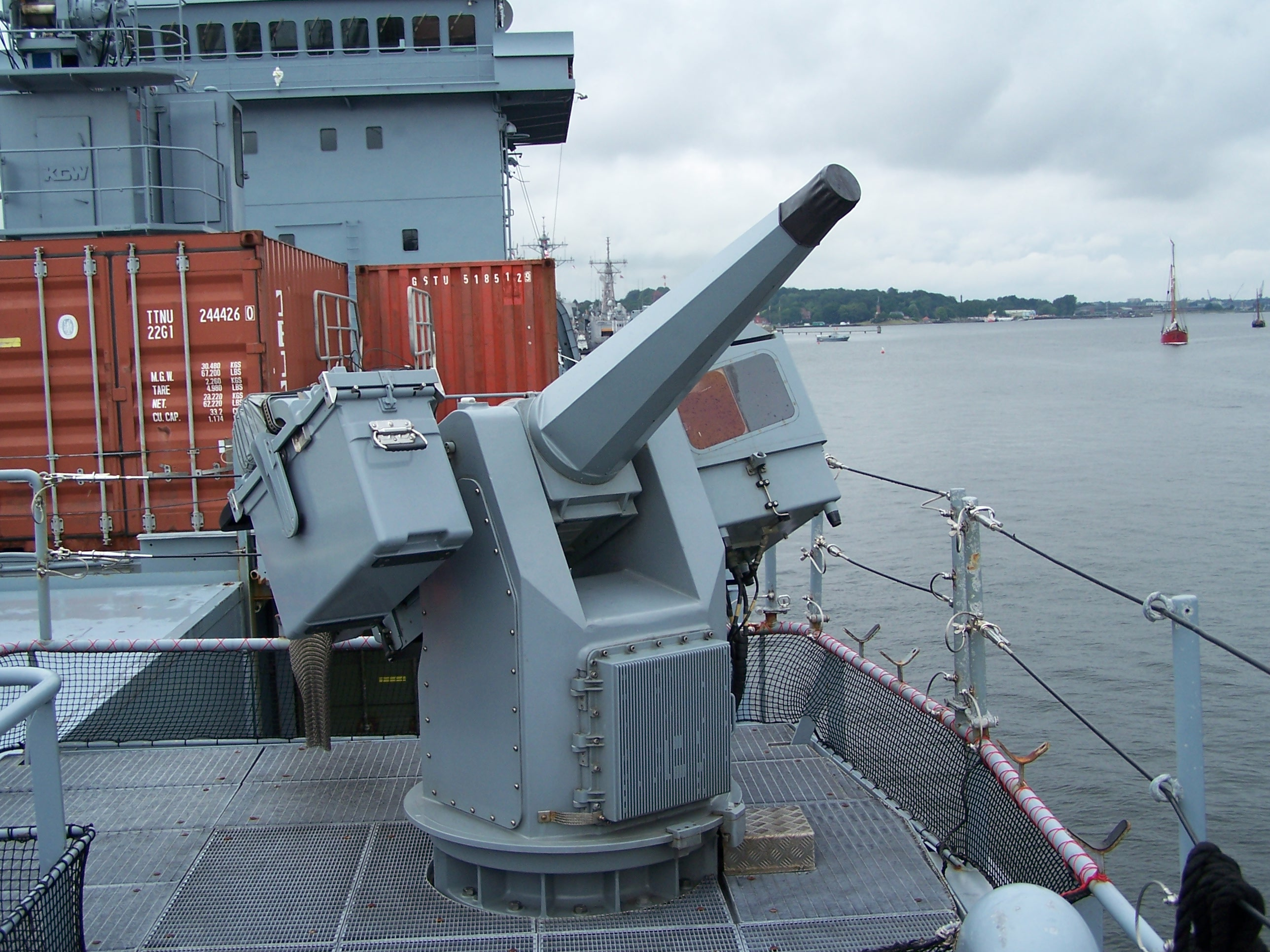
MLG-27 onboard Elbe-class tender Rhein.

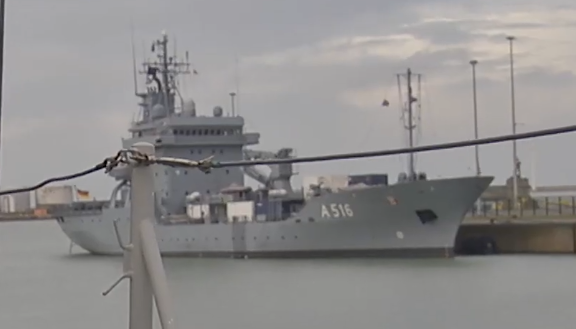
Donau in the Belgian Navy Base of Zeebrugge.
