= Mosel =

Mosel may mean the following:

== People and businesses ==
- Mosel (surname), notable people with this surname
- Mosel Vitelic Corporation, subsidiary of Mosel Vitelic Inc. focused on memory integrated circuits
- Mosel Vitelic Inc., a semiconductor company listed on the Taiwan Stock Exchange

== Computing ==
- Mosel (programming language), mathematical programming language for optimization software

== Places ==
- Moselle, a European river, named Mosel in German
- Mosel (wine region), a German appellation, formerly known as Mosel-Saar-Ruwer
- Mosel, Wisconsin, U.S.A., a town
  - Mosel (community), Wisconsin, an unincorporated community
- Mosel (Zwickau), a community in Southeastern Germany

== Ships ==
- V-1605 Mosel, a German trawler in World War II
- Mosel (A512), a modern German replenishment ship

== See also ==
- Moselle (disambiguation)
- Mosul, a city in Iraq
