= German ship Werra =

Elbe-class replenishment ship

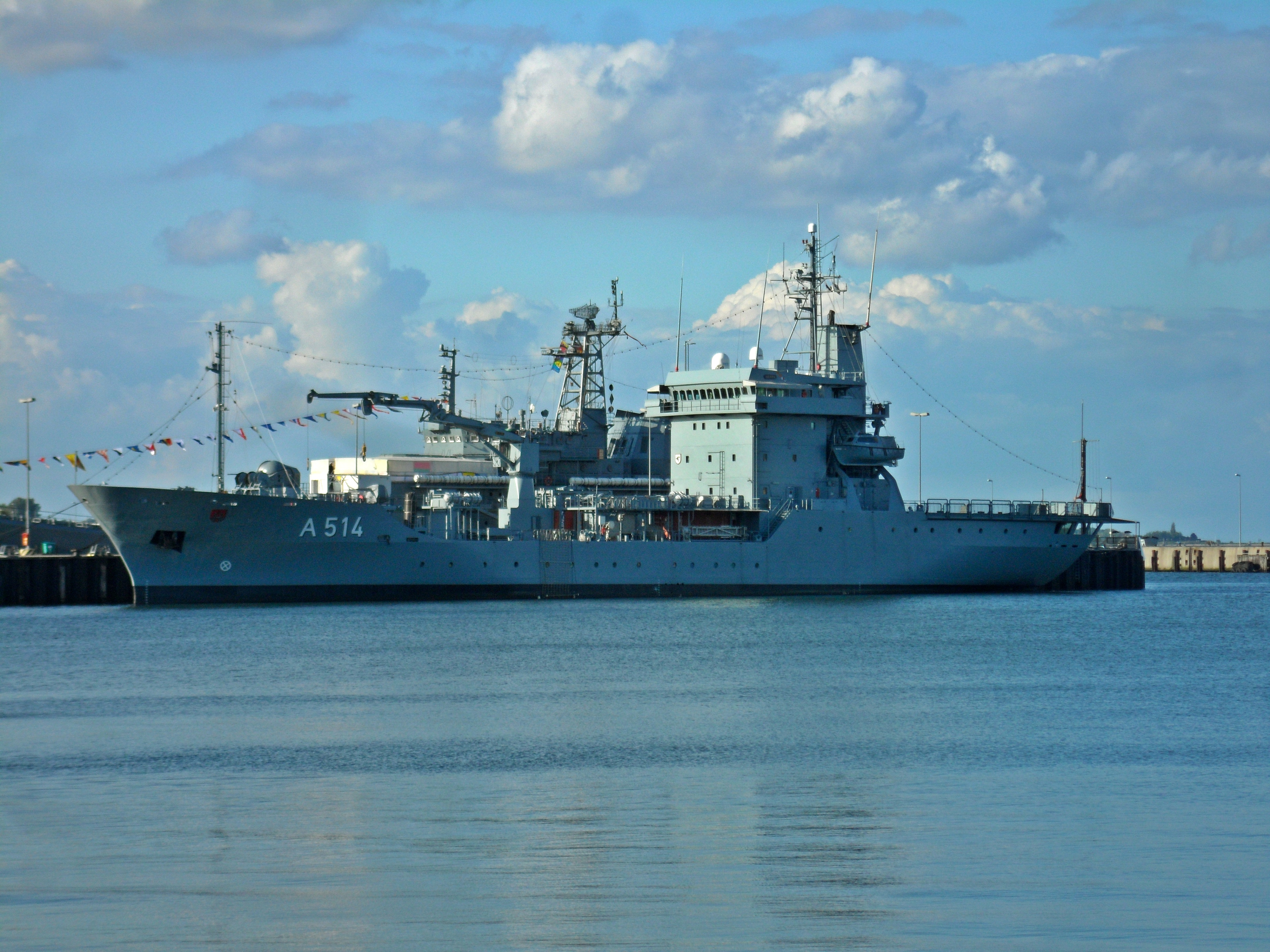
- Werra on 2 June 2011

History

Germany
- Name: Werra
- Namesake: Werra
- Builder: Bremer Vulkan
- Launched: June 1993
- Commissioned: 9 December 1993
- Home port: Kiel
- Identification: MMSI number: 211210100; Callsign: DRHM; Pennant number: A514
- Status: Active

General characteristics
- Type: Elbe-class replenishment ship
- Displacement: 3,586 tonnes
- Length: 100.55 m (329 ft 11 in)
- Beam: 15.40 m (50 ft 6 in)
- Draft: 4.05 m (13 ft 3 in)
- Propulsion: 1 × Deutz-MWM SBV diesel engines; 2,562 kW, Bow thruster
- Speed: 15 knots (28 km/h)
- Range: 2,600 nmi (4,800 km)
- Capacity: 24 standard 6.2 m containers (maximum); Supplies: 700 m³ fuel; 60 m³ aviation (helicopter) fuel; 280 m³ fresh water; 160 tonnes ammunition; 40 tonnes supplies; Disposal: 5 tonnes solid waste; 180 m³ waste water; 32 m³ waste oil
- Complement: 40 (standard) + >38 (repair party, passengers, squadron staff)
- Armament: 2 × Fliegerfaust 2 surface-to-air missile stands (MANPADS); 2 × Rheinmetall Rh202 20 mm autocannon; being replaced by 2 × MLG-27 27 mm remote controlled autocannons
- Aviation facilities: Helipad

Werra (A514) is the fourth ship of the Elbe-class replenishment ships of the German Navy.

== Development ==
The Elbe-class replenishment ships are also known tenders of the German Navy. In German, this type of ship is called Versorgungsschiffe which can be translated as "supply ship" though the official translation in English is "replenishment ship".

They are intended to support German naval units away from their home ports. The ships carry fuel, provisions, ammunition and other matériel and also provide medical services. The ships are named after large German rivers.

== Construction and career ==
Werra was launched in June 1993 in Bremen-Vegesack, Germany. She was commissioned on 9 December 1993.

On 2 February 2019, Rhein left her home port of Kiel. The ship, which is part of the support squadron, will be the flagship of the Standing NATO Mine Countermeasures Group 2 (SNMCMG2) and the Mediterranean for the next five months.

== Gallery ==
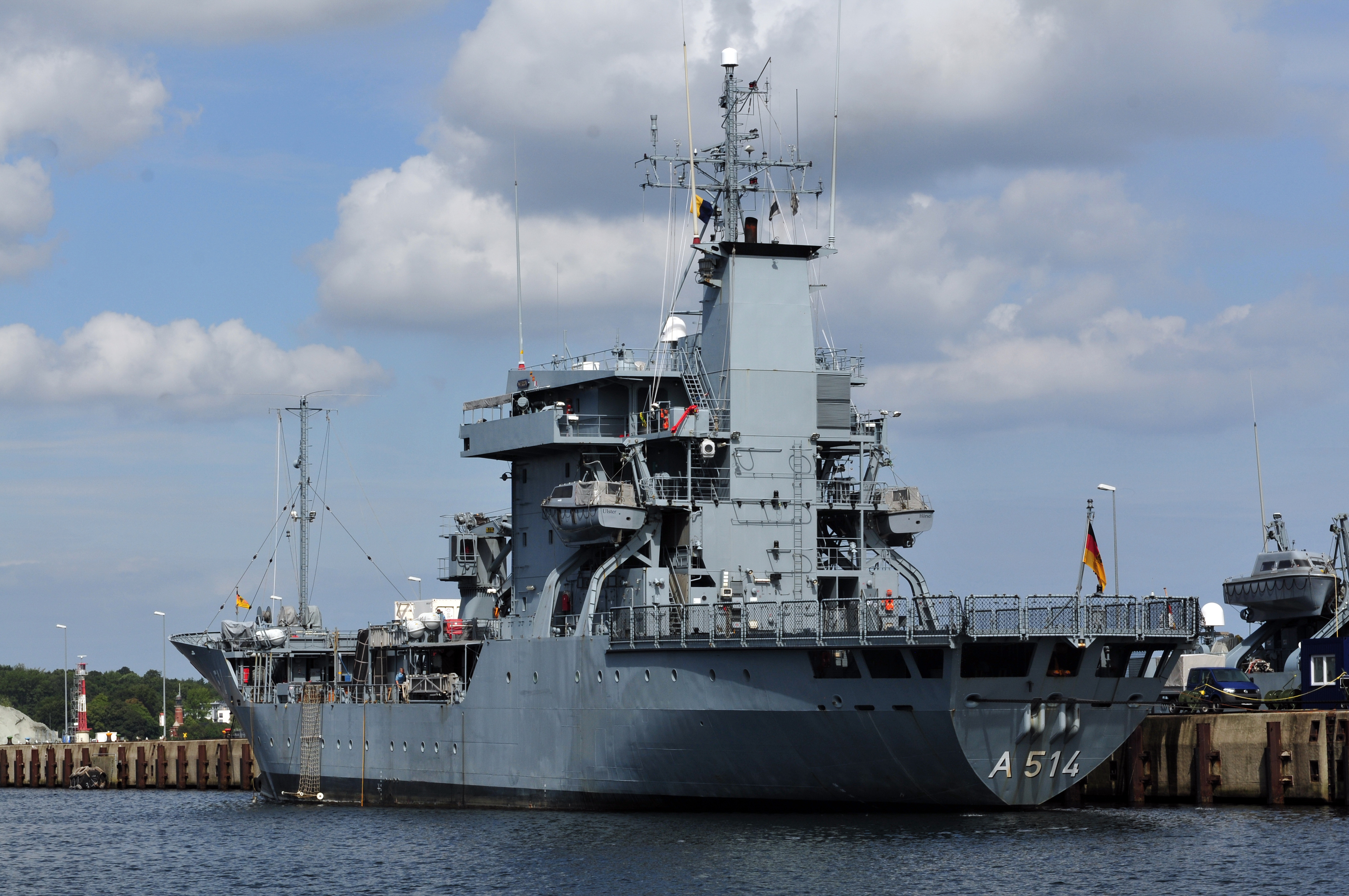
Werra on 21 August 2013

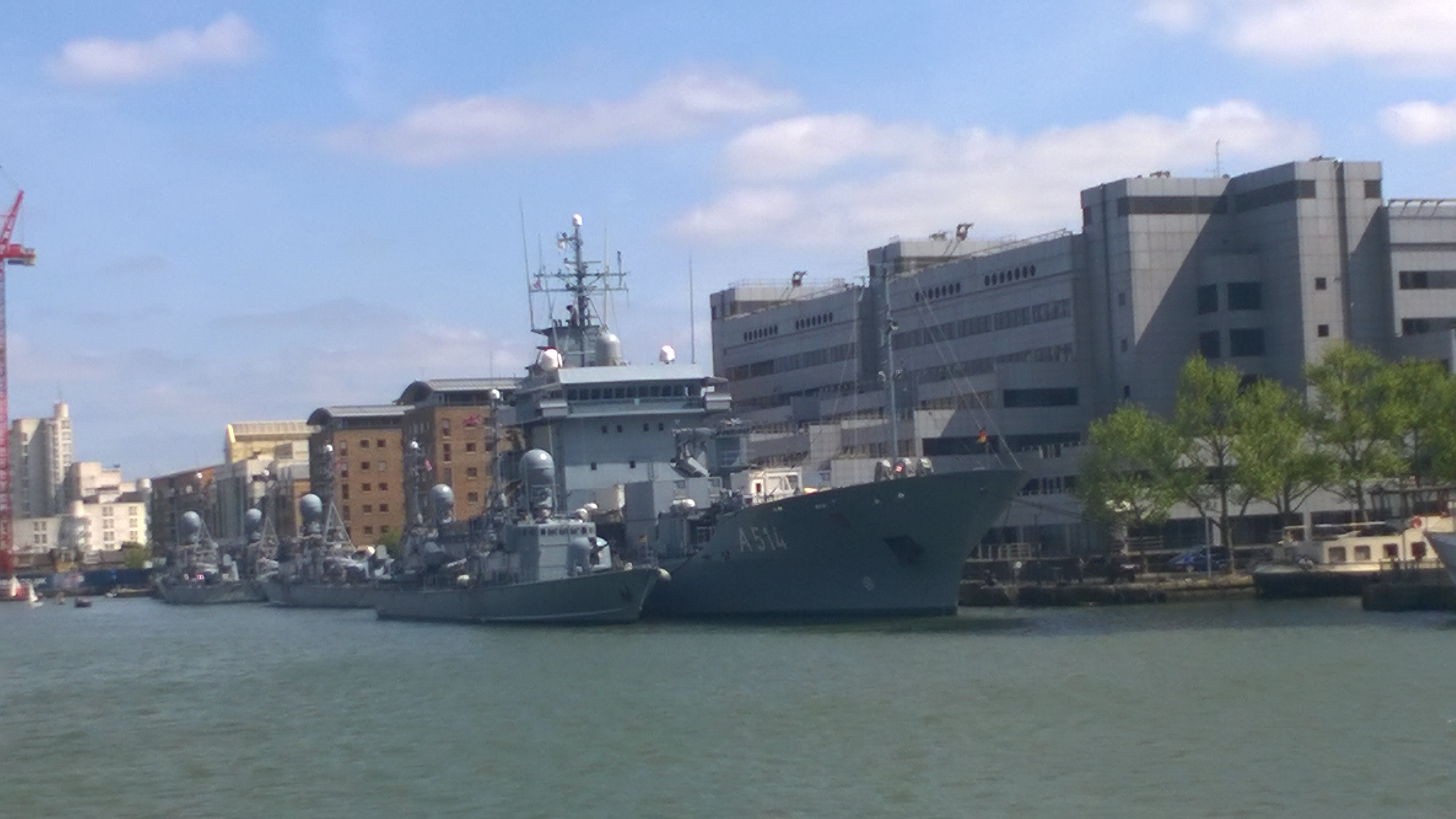
Werra in London on 10 May 2015

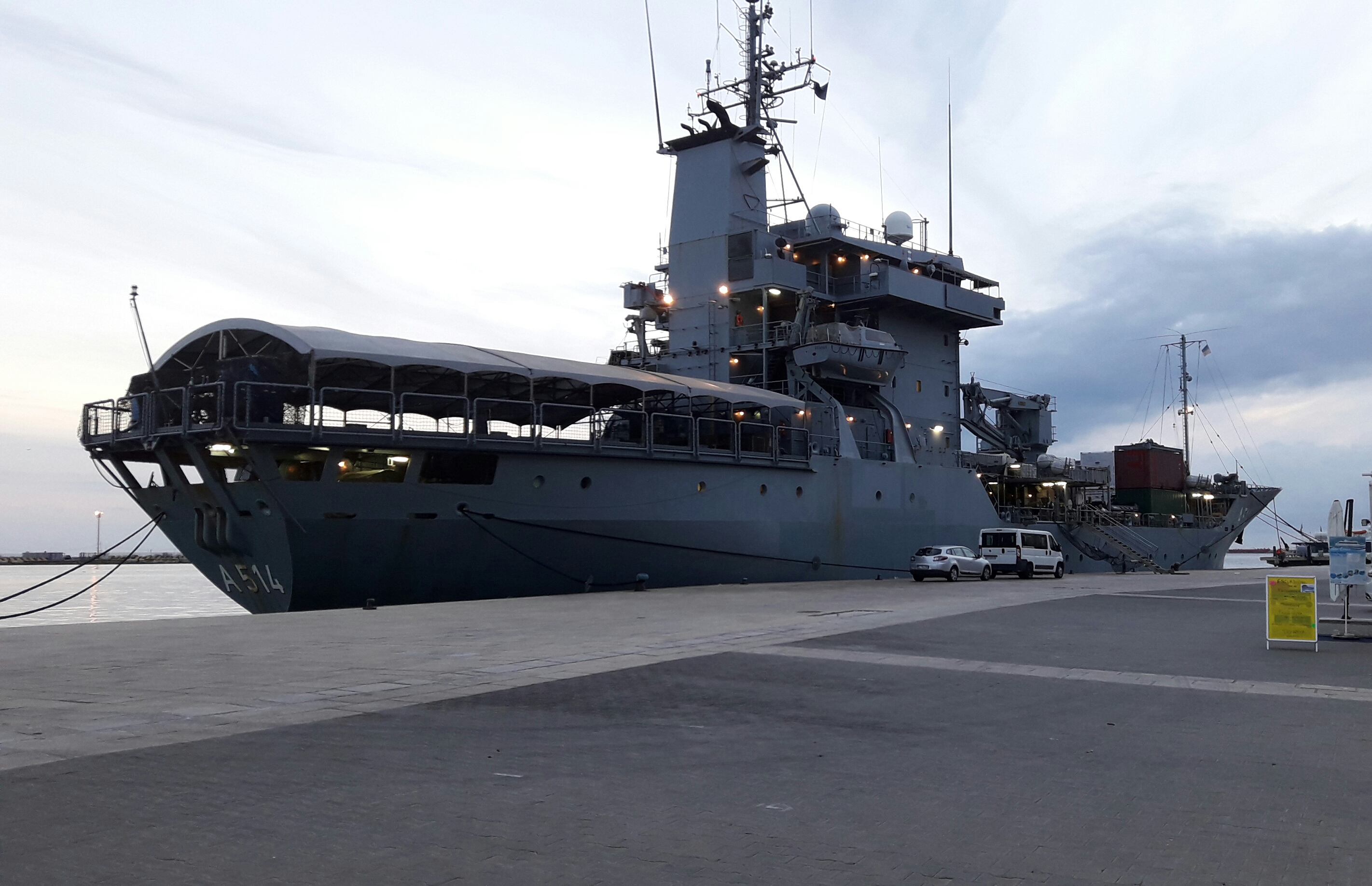
Werra on 18 October 2016

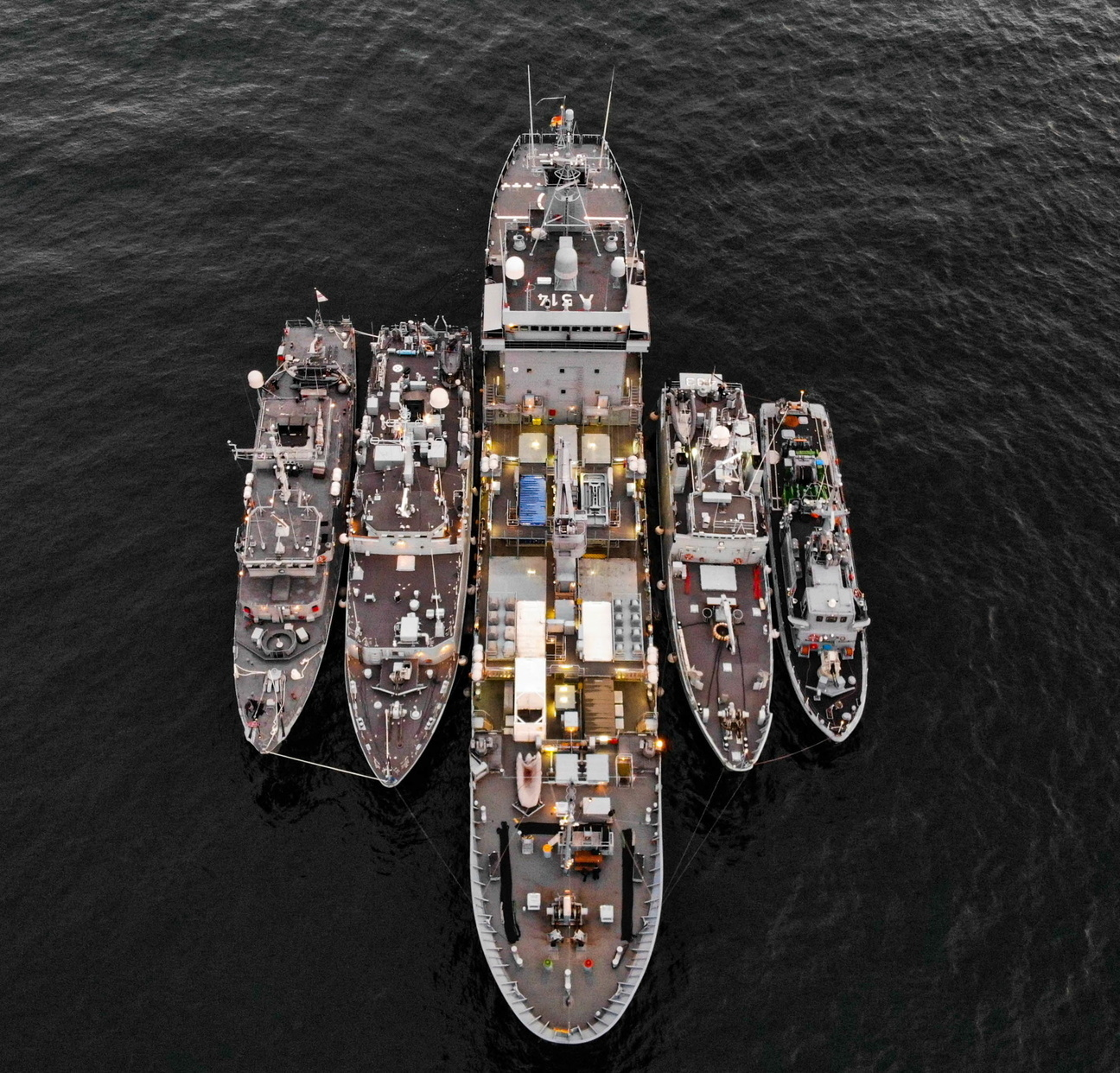
Werra during BALTOPS on 16 June 2020
