= Mosel (surname) =

Mosel is a surname. It may refer to:

- Arlene Mosel (1921–1996), American librarian and children's writer
- Darrel Mosel, American politician
- Hans von der Mosel (1898–1969), German noble and Nazi army general
- Ignaz von Mosel (1772–1844), Austrian noble, court official, composer, musician, and music writer
- Tad Mosel (1922–2008), American playwright and screenwriter
- Ulrich Mosel (born 1943), German theoretical physicist and professor
- Ulrike Mosel (born ?), German linguistics writer and professor

== See also ==
- Mosel (disambiguation)
- Vanessa Benelli Mosell (born 1987), Italian pianist and conductor
- Mostel (surname), a similarly spelled surname
