= German ship Donau =

Elbe-class replenishment ship

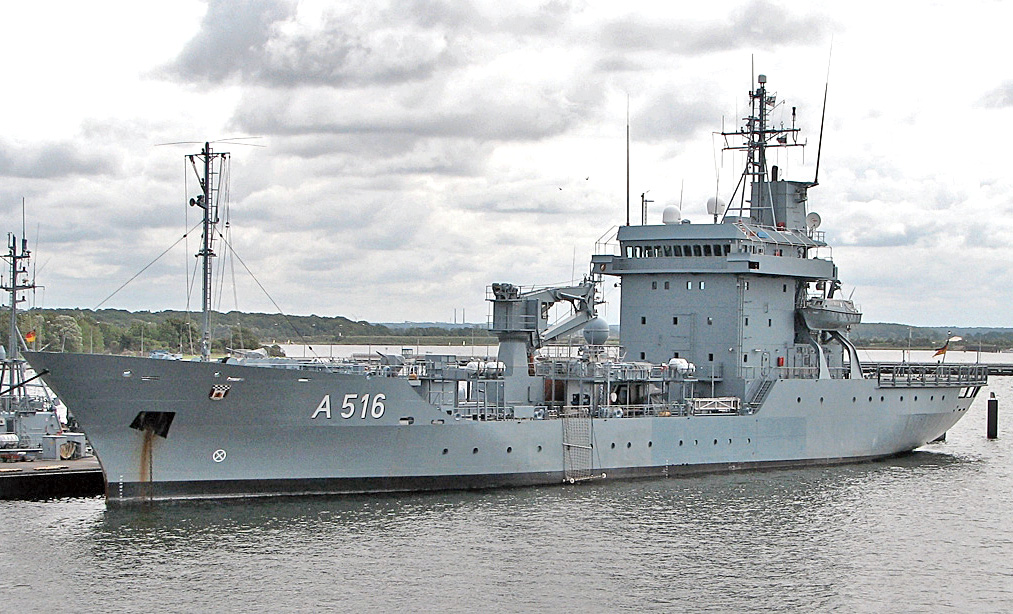
- Donau on 13 August 2005

History

Germany
- Name: Donau
- Namesake: Donau
- Builder: Bremer Vulkan
- Launched: March 1994
- Commissioned: 15 November 1994
- Home port: Warnemünde
- Identification: MMSI number: 211211520; Callsign: DRHO; Pennant number: A516
- Status: Active

General characteristics
- Type: Elbe-class replenishment ship
- Displacement: 3,586 tonnes
- Length: 100.55 m (329 ft 11 in)
- Beam: 15.40 m (50 ft 6 in)
- Draft: 4.05 m (13 ft 3 in)
- Propulsion: 1 × Deutz-MWM SBV diesel engines; 2,562 kW, Bow thruster
- Speed: 15 knots (28 km/h)
- Range: 2,600 nmi (4,800 km)
- Capacity: 24 standard 6.2 m containers (maximum); Supplies: 700 m³ fuel; 60 m³ aviation (helicopter) fuel; 280 m³ fresh water; 160 tonnes ammunition; 40 tonnes supplies; Disposal: 5 tonnes solid waste; 180 m³ waste water; 32 m³ waste oil
- Complement: 40 (standard) + >38 (repair party, passengers, squadron staff)
- Armament: 2 × Fliegerfaust 2 surface-to-air missile stands (MANPADS); 2 × Rheinmetall Rh202 20 mm autocannon; being replaced by 2 × MLG-27 27 mm remote controlled autocannons
- Aviation facilities: Helipad

Donau (A516) is the sixth ship of the Elbe-class replenishment ships of the German Navy.

== Development ==
The Elbe-class replenishment ships are also known as tenders of the German Navy. In German, this type of ship is called Versorgungsschiffe which can be translated as "supply ship" though the official translation in English is "replenishment ship".

They are intended to support German naval units away from their home ports. The ships carry fuel, provisions, ammunition and other matériel and also provide medical services. The ships are named after German rivers where German parliaments were placed.

== Construction and career ==
Donau was launched in March 1994 in Bremen-Vegesack, Germany. She was commissioned on 15 November 1994.

On 11 January 2020, Donau under the command of Captain Bernd Abshagen left her home port of Warnemünde to join the Standing NATO Mine Countermeasures Group 1 (SNMCMG1).

Until July 2024, it was part of the Very High Readiness Joint Task Force Maritime (VJTF (M)) in the North Sea and the Baltic Sea.

== Gallery ==
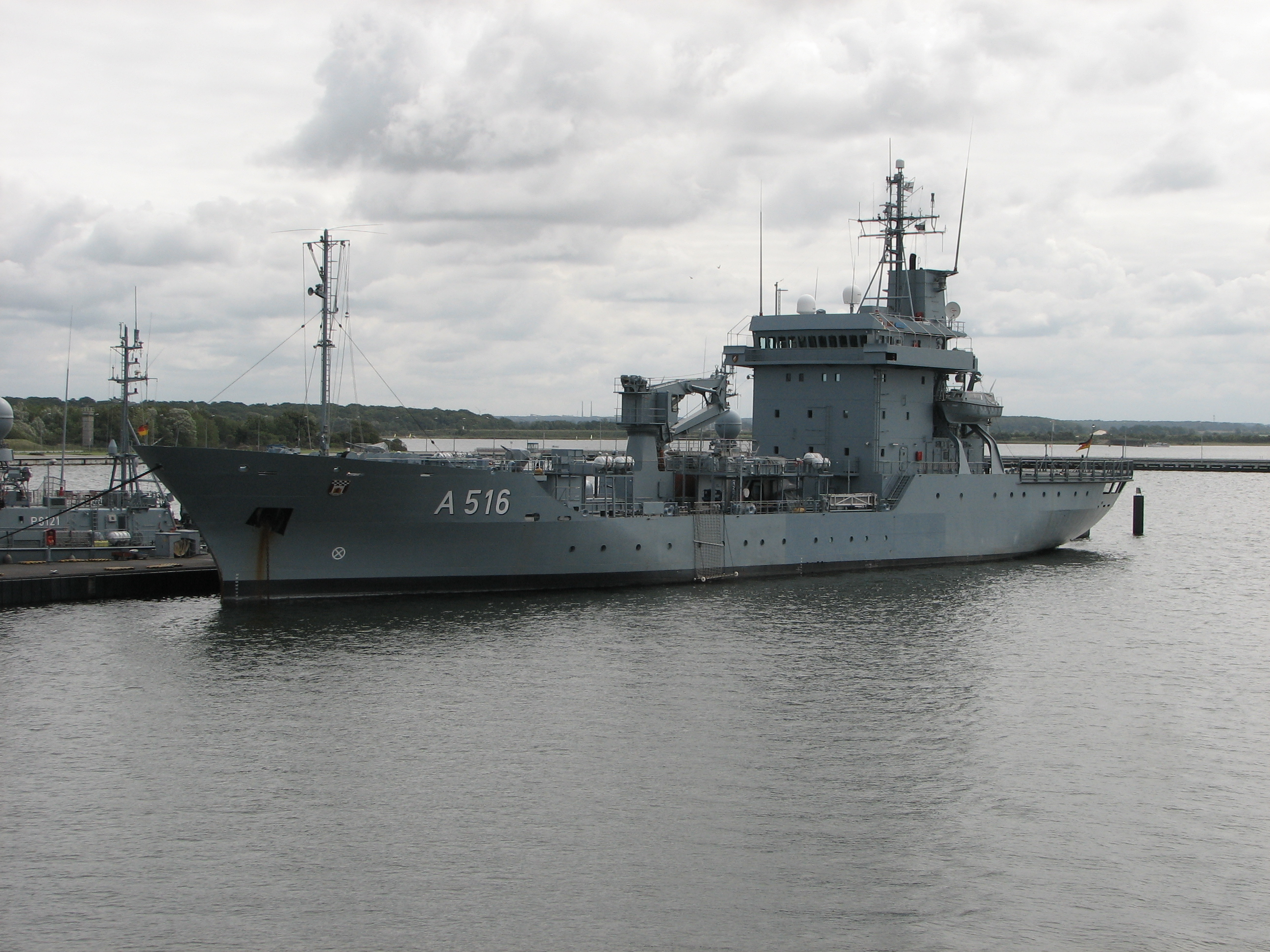
Donau on 13 August 2005

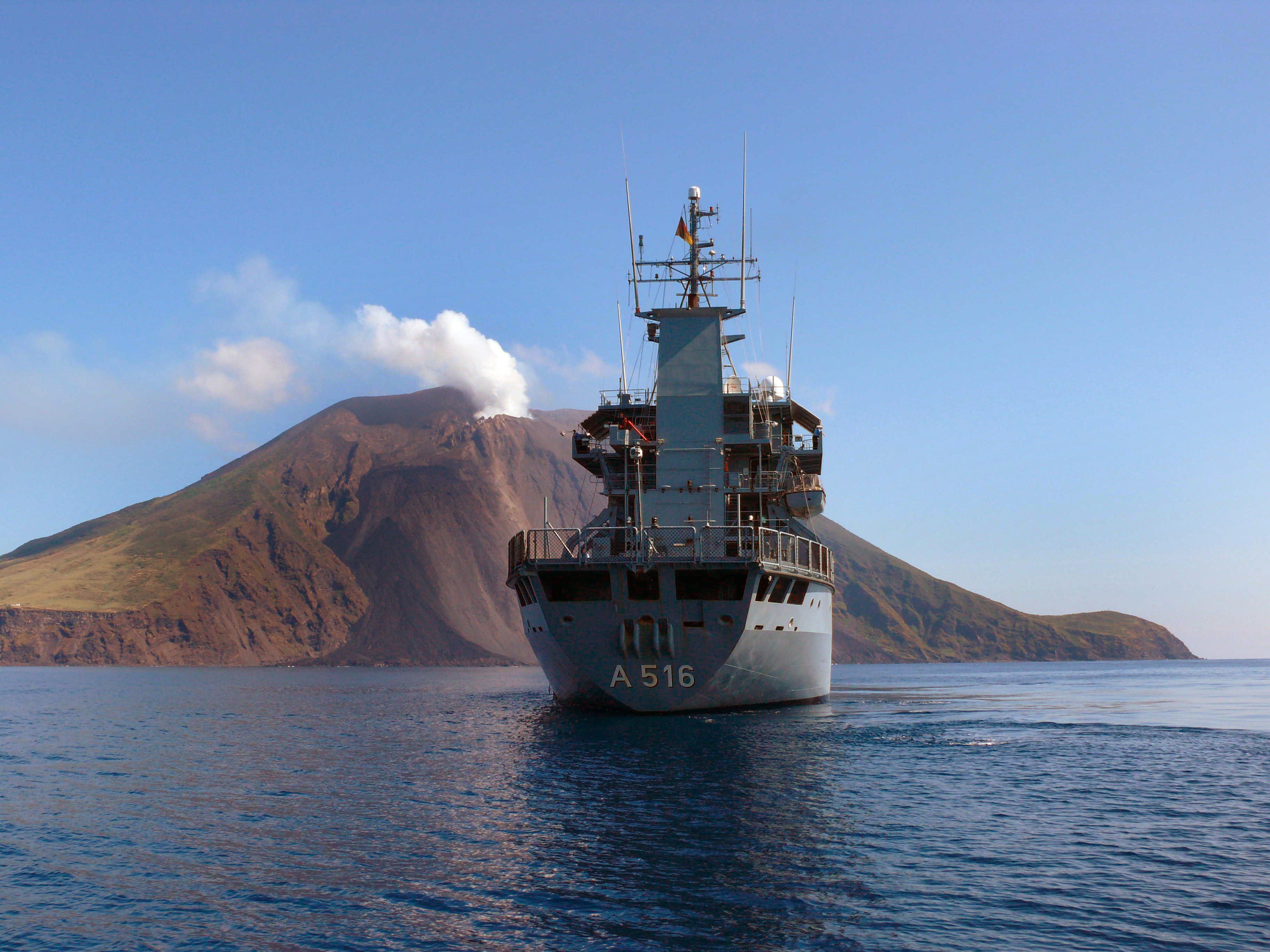
Donau on 1 August 2010

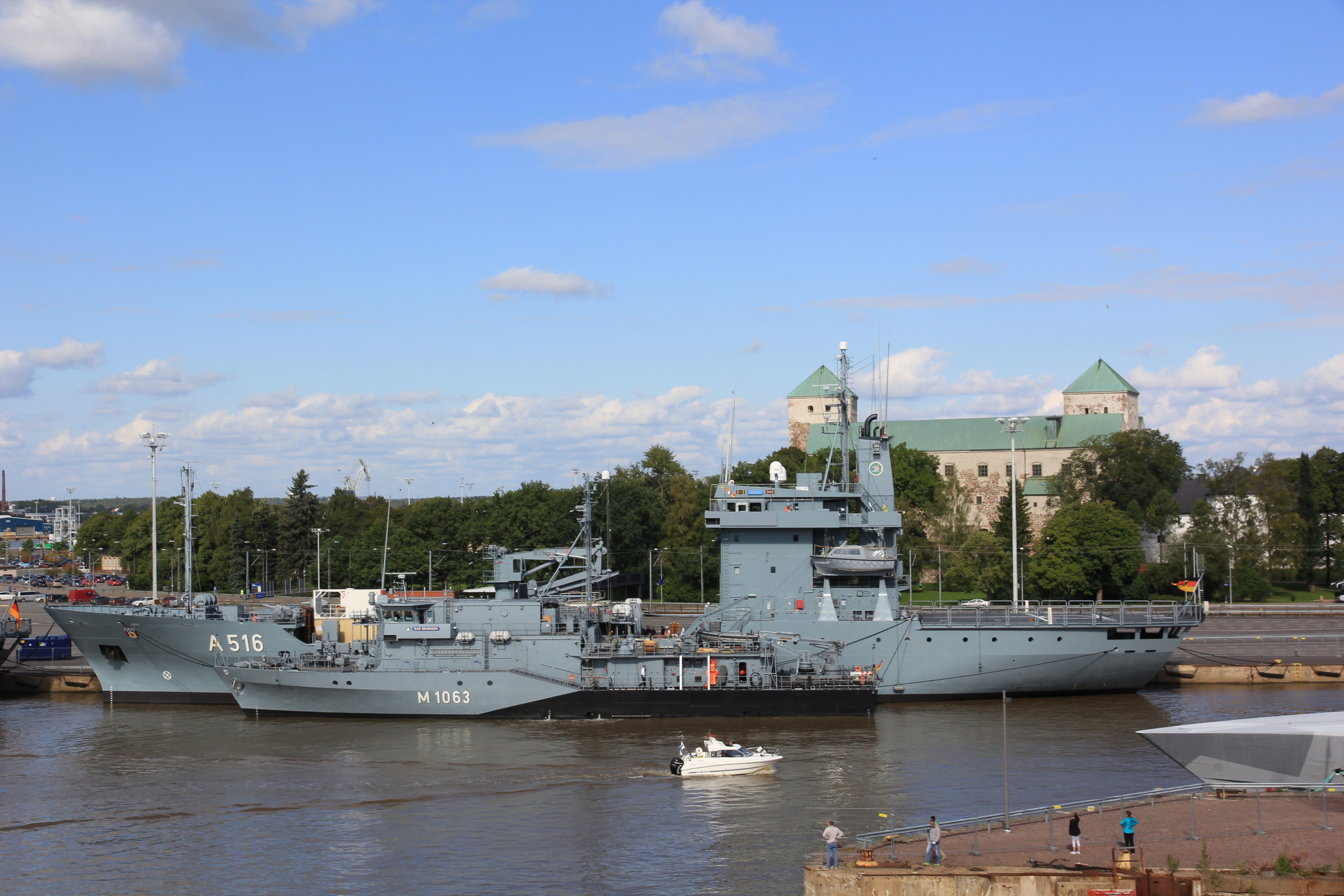
Donau and Bad Bevensen on 31 August 2014

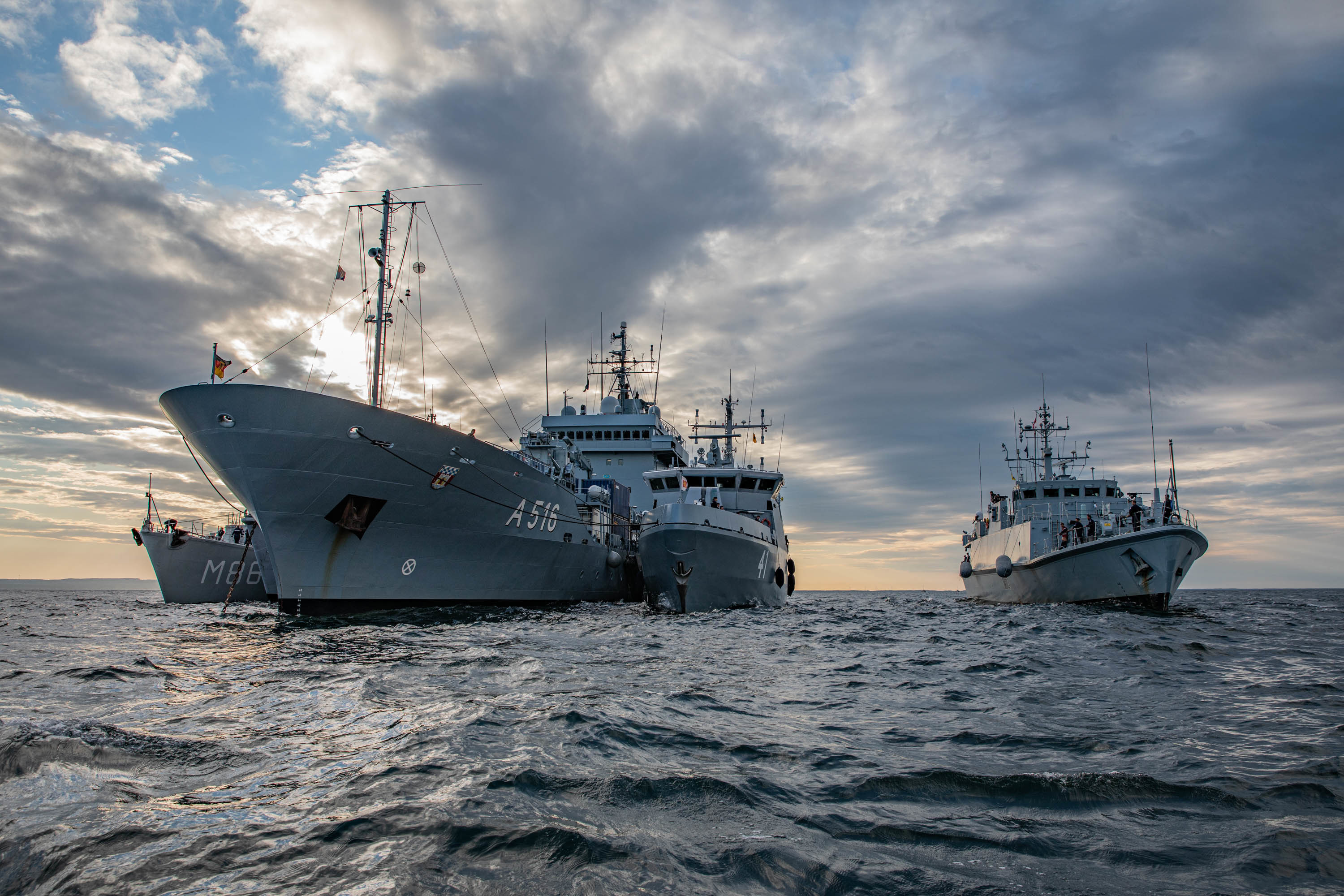
Donau during BALTOPS on 16 June 2020
