= Moselle (disambiguation) =

Moselle is a river in France, Luxembourg and Germany.

Moselle may also refer to:

- Moselle (department), French département surrounding the river
- Moselle (riverboat), American 19th-century riverboat
- Moselle wine from the region around the river
- River Moselle (London), England
- Moselle, Mississippi, unincorporated community in the United States
- Moselle, Missouri, unincorporated community in the United States
- Mosel, Wisconsin, township in the United States, sometimes spelled Moselle and named after the river
  - Mosel, Wisconsin, unincorporated community in the above township
- Open de Moselle, ATP tennis tournament
- Moselle, the nicknamed household hunting property property on which disgraced South Carolina lawyer Alex Murdaugh murdered his wife, Maggie Murdaugh, and youngest son, Paul Murdaugh.

== See also ==
- Mosel (disambiguation)
- Mozelle (disambiguation)
