= Mozelle =

Mozelle may refer to:

- Mozelle, Kentucky, an unincorporated community in Leslie County
- Mozelle, West Virginia, an unincorporated community in Jackson County

== See also ==
- Moselle (disambiguation)
