= German ship Mosel =

Elbe-class replenishment ship

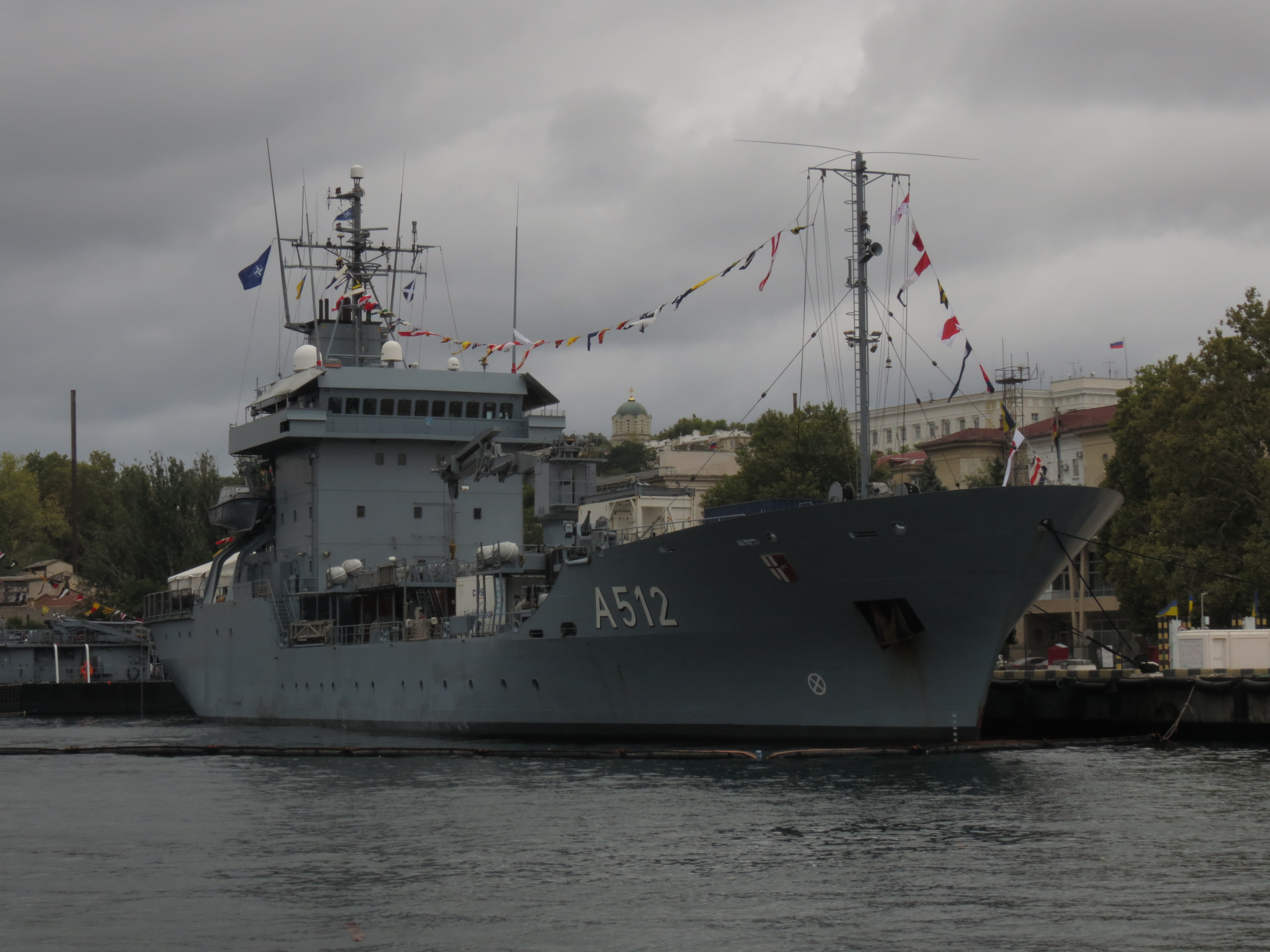
- Mosel on 30 August 2013

History

Germany
- Name: Mosel
- Namesake: Mosel
- Builder: Bremer Vulkan
- Launched: April 1993
- Commissioned: 1 July 1993
- Home port: Kiel
- Identification: MMSI number: 211211490; Callsign: DRHK; Pennant number: A512
- Status: Active

General characteristics
- Type: Elbe-class replenishment ship
- Displacement: 3,586 tonnes
- Length: 100.55 m (329 ft 11 in)
- Beam: 15.40 m (50 ft 6 in)
- Draft: 4.05 m (13 ft 3 in)
- Propulsion: 1 × Deutz-MWM SBV diesel engines; 2,562 kW, Bow thruster
- Speed: 15 knots (28 km/h)
- Range: 2,600 nmi (4,800 km)
- Capacity: 24 standard 6.2 m containers (maximum); Supplies: 700 m³ fuel; 60 m³ aviation (helicopter) fuel; 280 m³ fresh water; 160 tonnes ammunition; 40 tonnes supplies; Disposal: 5 tonnes solid waste; 180 m³ waste water; 32 m³ waste oil
- Complement: 40 (standard) + >38 (repair party, passengers, squadron staff)
- Armament: 2 × Fliegerfaust 2 surface-to-air missile stands (MANPADS); 2 × Rheinmetall Rh202 20 mm autocannon; being replaced by 2 × MLG-27 27 mm remote controlled autocannons
- Aviation facilities: Helipad

Mosel (A512) is the second ship of the Elbe-class replenishment ships of the German Navy.

== Development ==
The Elbe-class replenishment ships are also known tenders of the German Navy. In German, this type of ship is called Versorgungsschiffe which can be translated as "supply ship" though the official translation in English is "replenishment ship".

They are intended to support German naval units away from their home ports. The ships carry fuel, provisions, ammunition and other matériel and also provide medical services. The ships are named after German rivers where German parliaments were placed.

== Construction and career ==
Mosel was launched in April 1993 in Bremen-Vegesack, Germany. She was commissioned on 1 July 1993.

On 31 August 2013, Mosel and Rottweil visited Sevastopol.

== Gallery ==
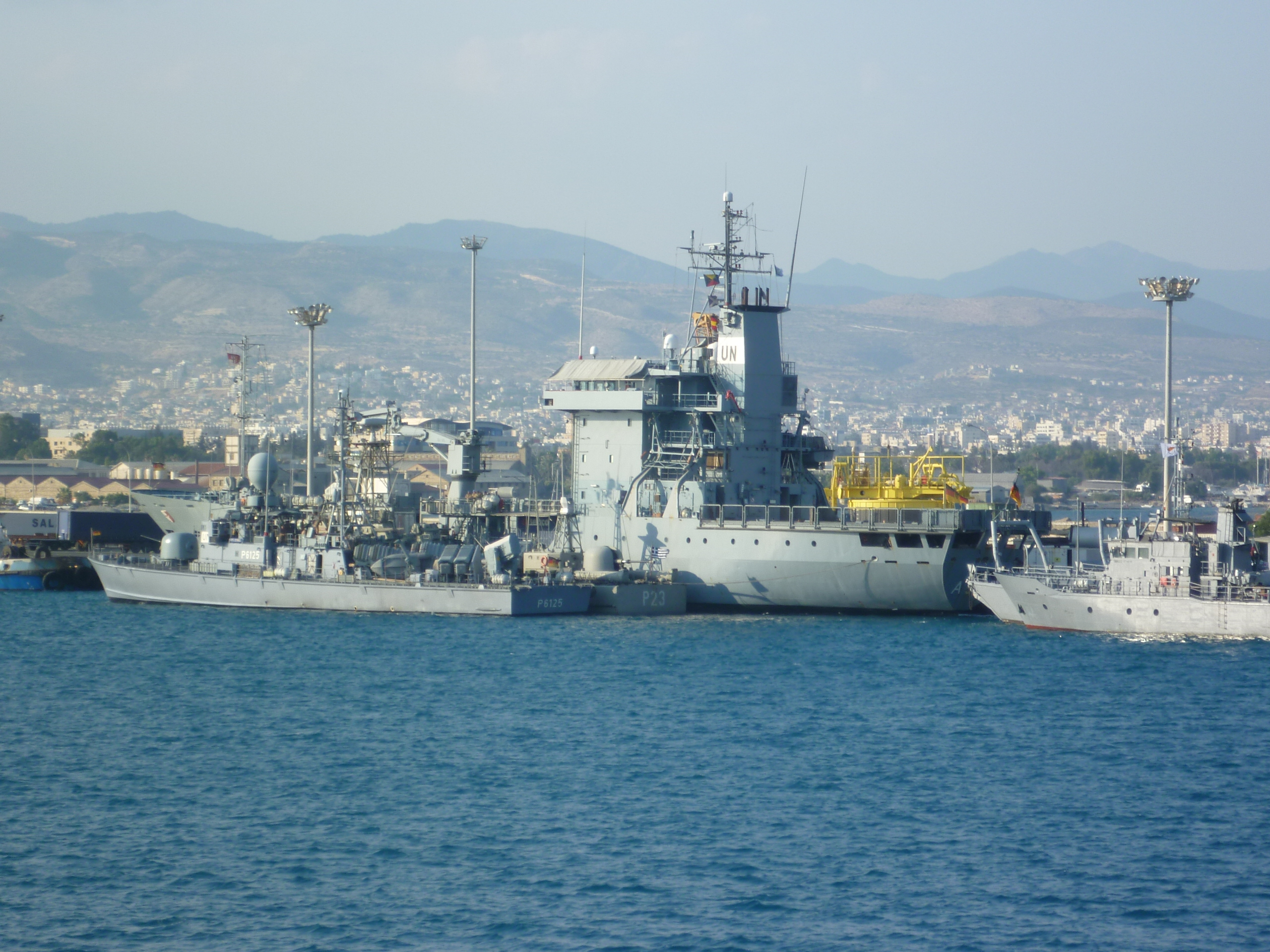
Mosel on 3 July 2011

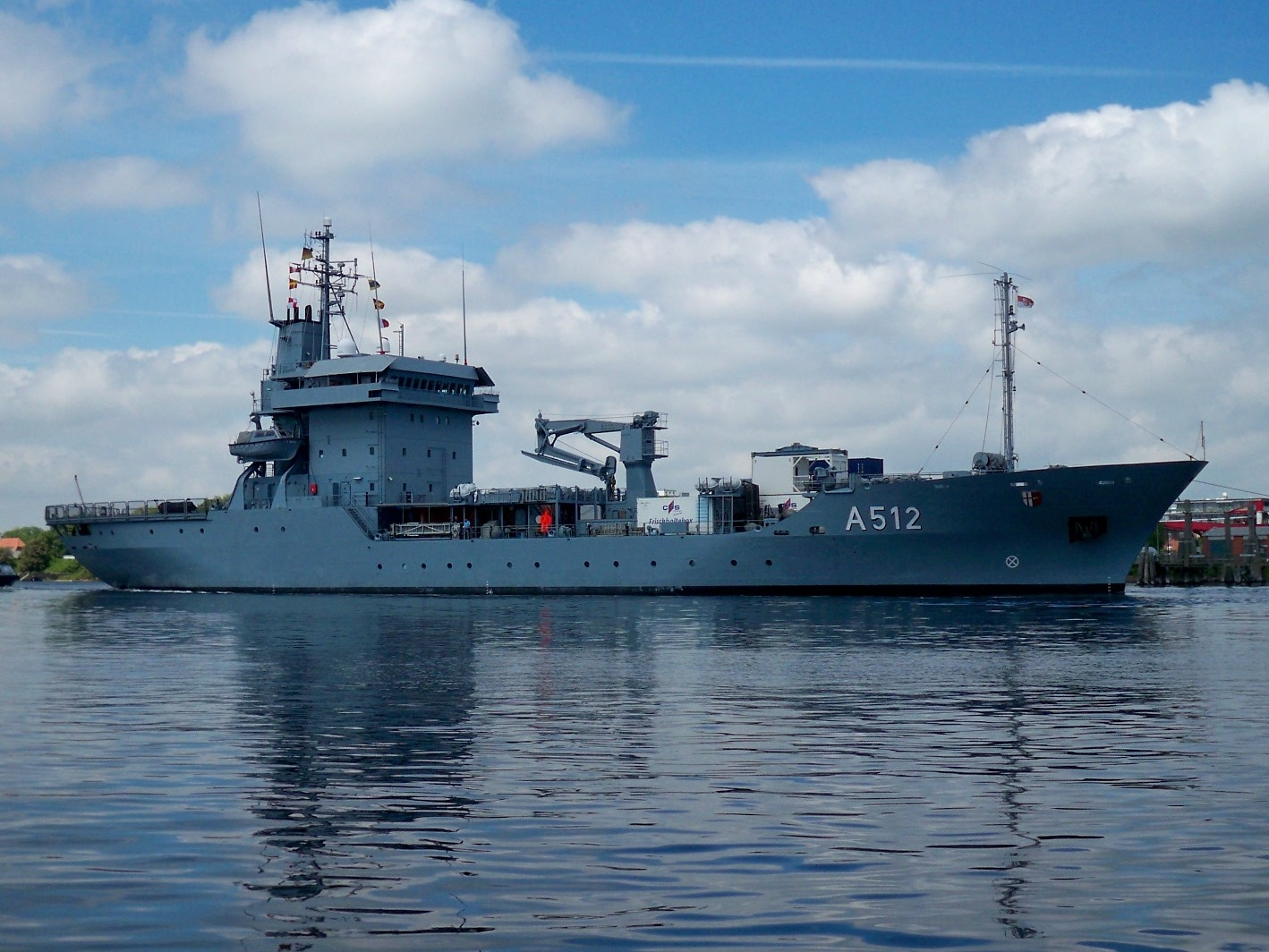
Mosel on 10 June 2013

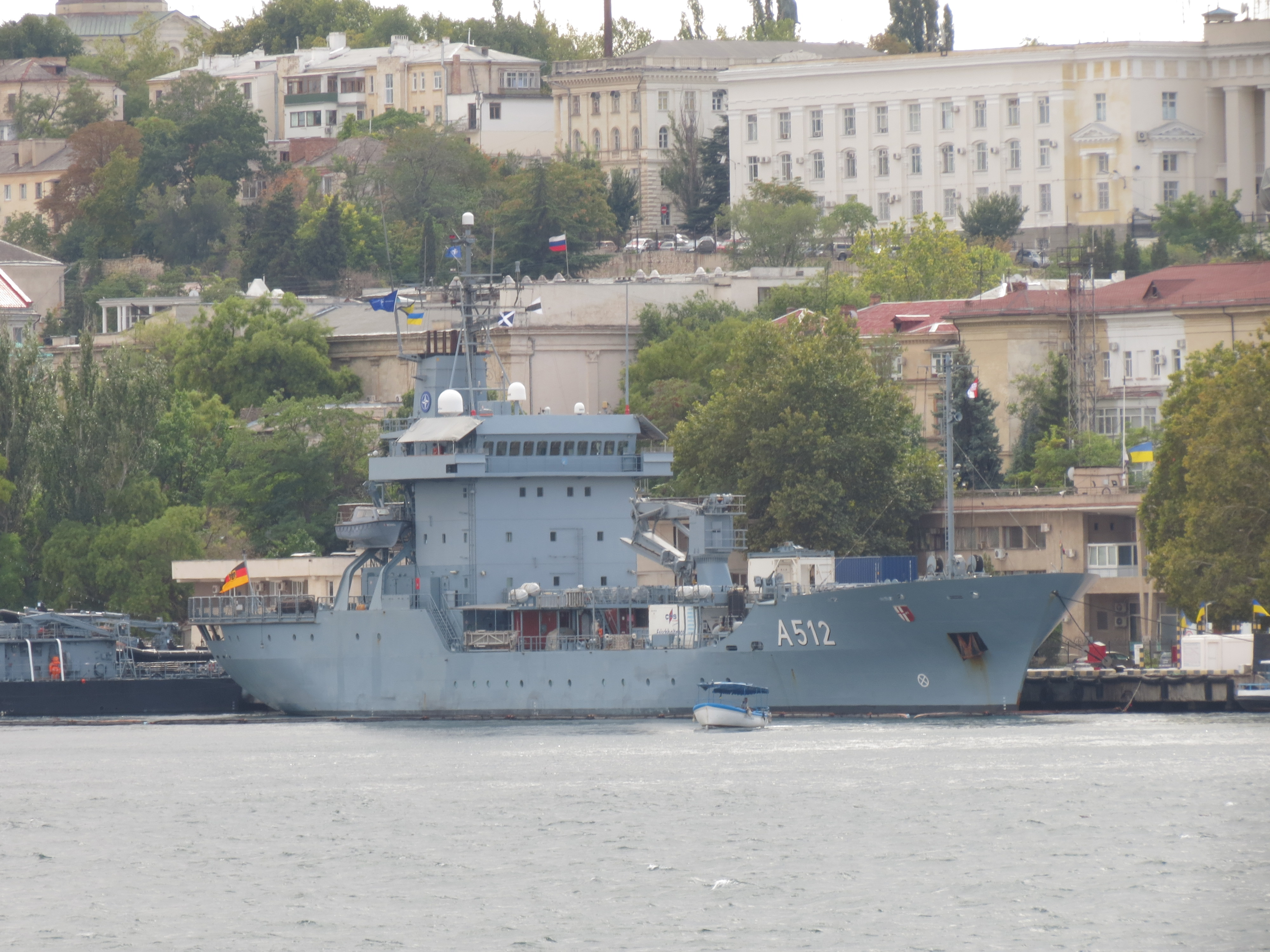
Mosel on 31 August 2013

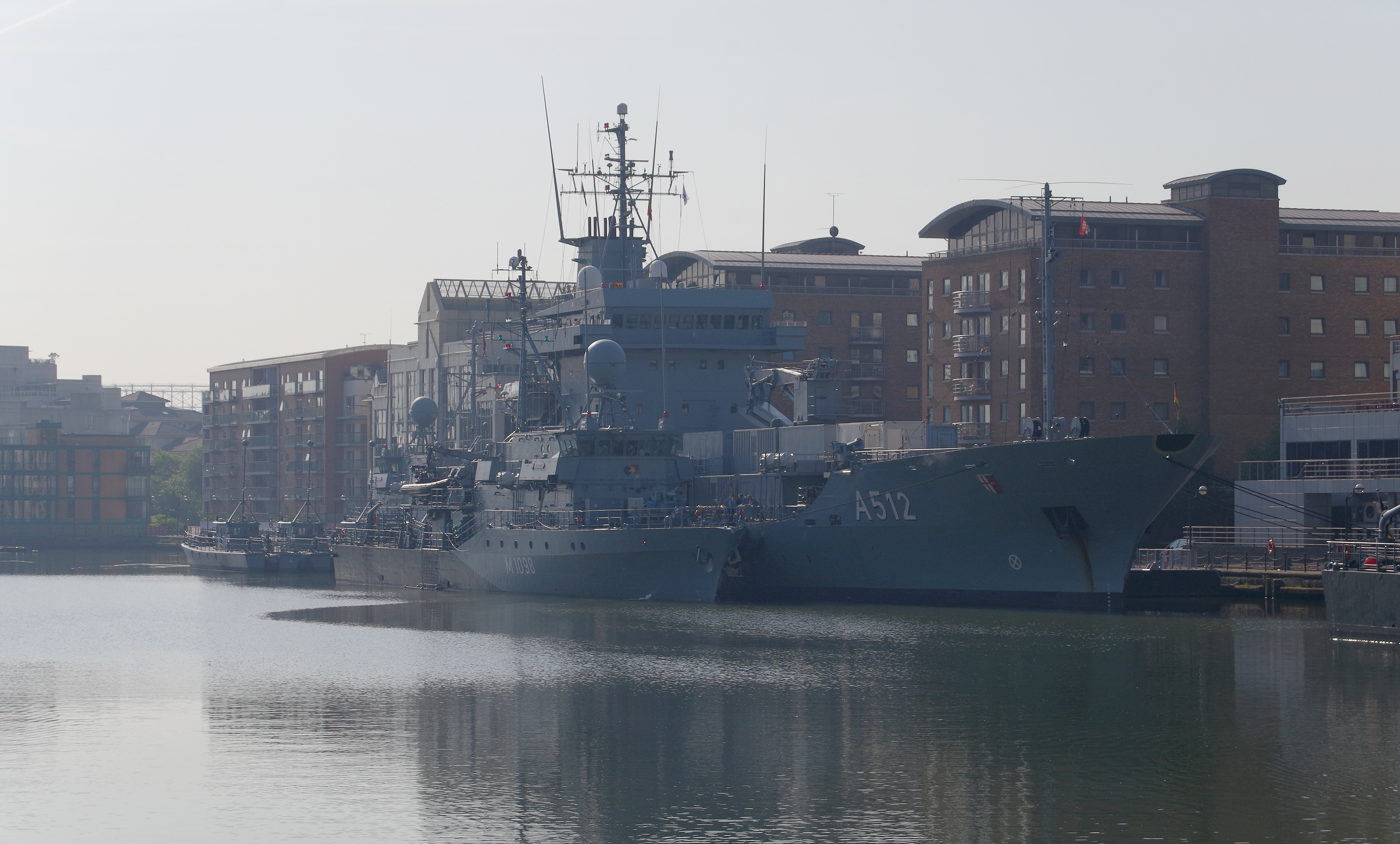
Mosel on 16 May 2014
