= Mostel =

Mostel is a surname. Notable people with the surname include:

- Josh Mostel (born 1946), American actor, son of Zero
- Zero Mostel (1915–1977), American actor, singer, and comedian

== See also ==
- Mosel (surname)
