= Ulrich Mosel =

German physicist

Ulrich Mosel (born Febr. 8, 1943 in Hannover, Germany) is a German theoretical physicist, professor emeritus at Justus-Liebig-Universität Giessen, Germany

Ulrich Mosel studied mathematics and physics at the J.W. Goethe University at Frankfurt a.M., Germany, from 1962 - 1968. He finished his studies with a degree of 'Diplom Physiker' in 1967. After that he worked with Walter Greiner and received his PhD in physics in 1968 with a thesis entitled "Investigation of collective potential energy surfaces of nuclei: superheavy nuclei". At that time he worked on a theoretical description of the structure of heavy and superheavy nuclei.

In early 1970 he went to the University of Tennessee, Knoxville, and to the Oak Ridge National Laboratory. From there he moved in 1971 to the University of Washington in Seattle. During this time he worked on a theoretical description of nuclear fission. In 1972 he was appointed as full professor for theoretical physics at the Justus-Liebig-Universität Giessen, Germany. In 1980/81 and in 1993/1994 he served as chairman of the physics department. He became a professor emeritus in April 2011. During his time at Giessen 9 professors and 47 PhDs in physics emerged from his group.

During his time at Giessen he was visiting scientist at Argonne National Laboratory and Lawrence Berkeley Laboratory. He was also guest professor at the State University of New York at Stony Brook, and the Michigan State University and the University of Washington. From 1982 - 88 he was a member of the Scientific Council of GSI Darmstadt and from 1997 - 2001 in its program advisory committee. At that time he also headed the division of nuclear and hadron physics of the German Physical Society. From 1995 to 2001 he was chairman of the COSY PAC and from 1997 - 2000 he was chairman of the scientific advisory board for hadron and nuclear physics of the German Federal Ministry for Science and Technology.

His early work centered on the structure of heavy and superheavy nuclei. Following that were studies of nuclear physics with an emphasis on the fission mass distributions within the two-center shell model. In 1976 he published the first microscopical calculation of the gas-liquid phase transition of nuclear matter. Later on self-consistent studies of nuclear rotational states followed, with an emphasis on magnetic moments as indicators for rotational alignment. Around 1990 Ulrich Mosel started to work with quantum-kinetic transport theory. This work mainly concentrated on particle production in relativistic heavy-ion collisions. One results of these studies was (together with Volker Metag) the prediction of the formation of resonance matter in such collisions and the investigation of in-medium properties of hadrons These calculations were later on extended to photo- and electro-nuclear processes on nuclei and, finally, on neutrino-interactions with nuclei. From the latter studies the neutrino event generator GiBUU emerged.

Ulrich Mosel is Fellow of the American Physical Society (1987) and Honorary Citizen of the State of Tennessee (1970)

== Books ==
- Fields, Symmetries and Quarks, 2nd ed, Springer 1999
- Path Integrals in Field Theory. Springer, 2004; Repr: Science Press, China, 2007

== All publications ==
Publications from Google Scholar
