= Caterpillar Energy Solutions =

German engineering company

Caterpillar Energy Solutions GmbH
- Type: Limited liability company (Gesellschaft mit beschränkter Haftung)
- Industry: engineering
- Predecessor: Benz & Cie.
- Founded: 2008; 18 years ago
- Headquarters: Mannheim, Germany
- Key people: Johan Masse, Gunter Steinmann
- Products: production of gensets (gas and diesel engines) for the generation of electrical energy from 400 to 10,300 kWel per unit
- Revenue: ▲480.6 million Euro (2024)
- Number of employees: 1,047 (2024)
- Parent: Caterpillar Inc.
- Website: caterpillar-energy-solutions.com

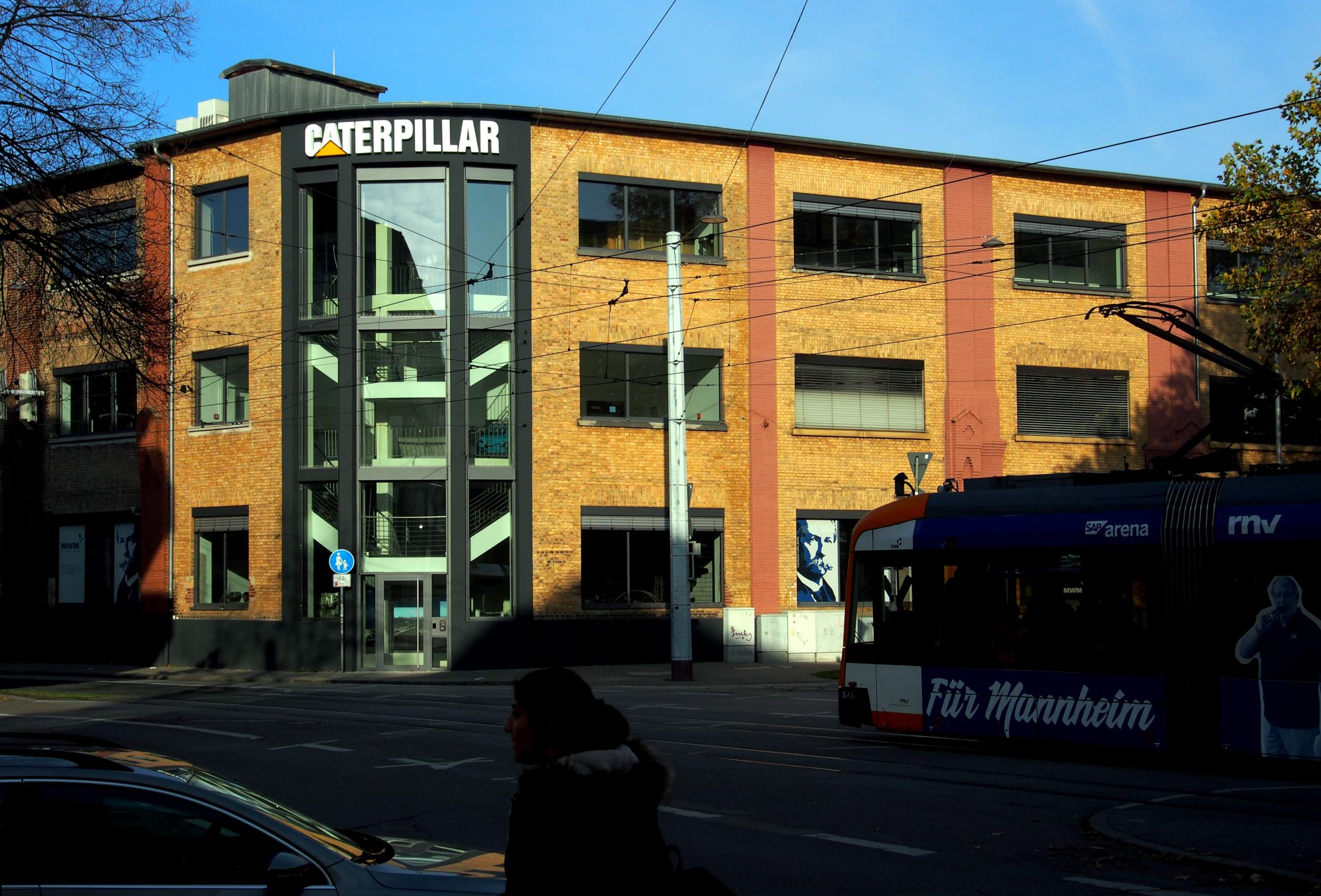
Caterpillar Energy Solutions GmbH headquarters in Mannheim, Germany

Caterpillar Energy Solutions GmbH, is a mechanical engineering company based in Mannheim, Baden-Württemberg, Germany. It was known as MWM GmbH Motoren-Werke Mannheim (MWM) until November 2013. In 2009 the company was the third-largest producer by revenue of gas and diesel engines.

The main focus of production is gas engines and gensets for the generation of electrical energy. It also provides consulting, designing, and engineering services, as well as construction and commissioning of plants and global after sales service. The company has its own training center.

== History ==
In 1922 the department for the construction of stationary engines was outsourced and had its name changed from Benz & Cie. Rheinische Gasmotorenfabrik in Mannheim to Motorenwerke Mannheim. The renowned German engineer Prosper L'Orange, a pioneer of diesel engine technology, was the technical manager then. Before that he worked for Benz & Cie. The construction of diesel engines in particular used to be the core business of MWM, amongst others for utility vehicles and agricultural machines.

In 1924 MWM manufactured their first tractor, which was called Motorpferd ("motor horse"). In 1931, tractor production was discontinued. For quite a long time, combines by Claas, tractors by the French manufacturer Renault, and by the German companies Fendt, Lanz, Bautz, Holder and Ritscher, were equipped with MWM engines.

In 1926 Knorr-Bremse AG was able to acquire the majority of shares and took over. In 1985 they sold MWM to Deutz AG (Cologne). The company's site was maintained. The company, along with MAN SE, remained the chief engine manufacturer in the field of commercial diesel engines in Germany. DEUTZ restructured the whole company several times and expanded the gas engine division.

MWM was known as Deutz Power Systems at the time 3i purchased it.

Logo as MWM GmbH

Today, Caterpillar Energy Solutions offers mainly gas engines for cogeneration units and biogas plants.

On 22 October 2010 Caterpillar Inc. officially announced an agreement with 3i regarding the acquisition of MWM for 580 million euros. Subject to the consent of prudential authorities MWM will then become part of Caterpillar's Electric Power Division.

On 8 October 2013, MWM announced that it would change its name to Caterpillar Energy Solutions from 1 November the same year.

In 2016, Dan G. Sundell became chief executive officer of Caterpillar Energy Solutions. He left the position in 2019 and was replaced by Johan Masse, Uwe Sternstein, and Peter Körner.
