= Antilla =

Antilla may refer to:

== Places ==
- Antilla, Cuba, a municipality and town
- Antilla, Salta, a village and rural municipality in northwestern Argentina
- La Antilla, a beach resort in Andalusia, Spain

== Ships ==
- USS Antilla (1904), a US Navy cargo ship
- SS Antilla (1939), a Hamburg America Line cargo ship scuttled by her crew off Aruba in 1940

== People ==
- Susan Antilla, freelance journalist

== Other ==
- Antilla (plant), a genus of plants in the family Orchidaceae
- Antilla Records, several record labels based in New York and Miami

== See also ==
- ANTILLAS I, a fiber optic submarine communications cable between the Dominican Republic and Puerto Rico
- Antillia, a mythical island in the Atlantic Ocean
- Antilia (building), world's most expensive home
- Antila, a surname
- Anttila (disambiguation)
