= SS Antilla =

SS Antilla is the name of the following ships

- SS Antilla (1903), commissioned as USS Antilla 1918–1919
- SS Antilla (1939), scuttled in 1940

== See also ==
- Antilla (disambiguation)
