= AIG bonus payments controversy =

Financial controversy

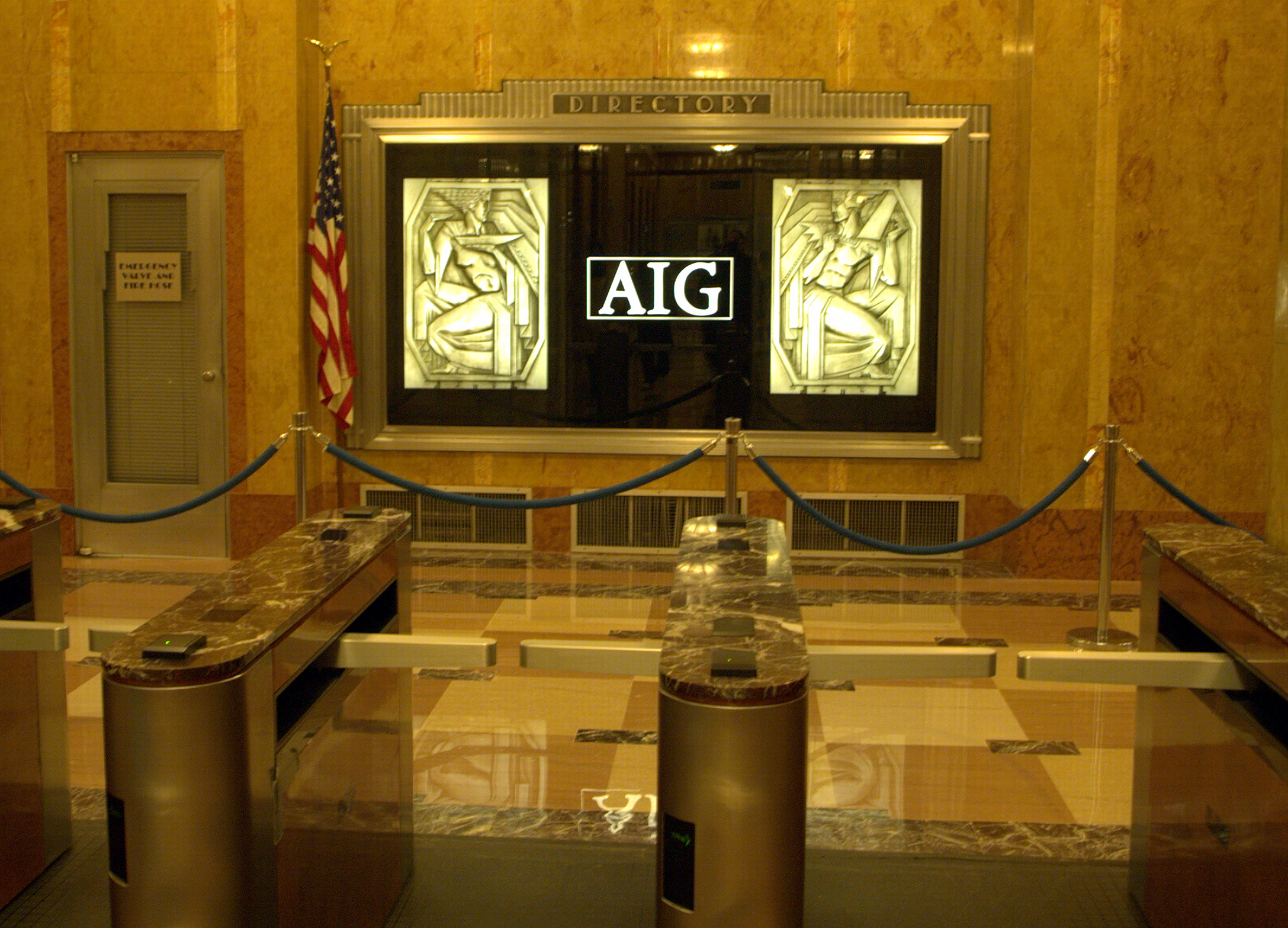
The lobby of AIG's headquarters in the American International Building.

The AIG bonus payments controversy began in March 2009, when it was publicly disclosed that the American International Group (AIG) insurance corporation was going to pay approximately $218 million (~$309 million in 2024) in bonus payments to employees of its financial services division.

AIG is notable for having received taxpayer bailouts and in the fourth quarter of 2008 posted a loss of $61.7 billion (~$88 billion in 2024), the greatest ever for any corporation. A total loss of US$61.7 billion during the fourth quarter of 2008 is equivalent to an average loss of approximately US$670.7 million per day, US$27.9 million per hour, US$465,731 per minute, and US$7,762 per second (assuming a 92-day quarter).Beyond the $165 million in bonus payments that were announced in March 2009, the total bonuses for the financial unit is unknown; it was estimated that it could have reached $450 million and bonuses for the entire company could have reached $1.2 billion.

The event sparked widespread outrage among both Democratic and Republican politicians, and from media commentators on all sides of the political spectrum. Both the House of Representatives and the Senate adopted bills that taxed these bonuses at a very high rate, but these bills were never signed into law and were opposed by the financial sector and President Barack Obama.

In the end, some AIG employees, including 15 out of the 20 top executives of the company, paid back the bonuses they received to the company. In total, 50 million dollars in bonuses paid were returned to AIG. Following this announcement, House Majority leader Steny Hoyer concluded that the scandal did not warrant a legislative response.

== Background ==
AIG had insured the toxic financial assets that caused the subprime mortgage crisis without making rigorous risk assessments. They attracted many contracts from Real Estate investors because their investment insurance policies were cheaper than market value. With the windfalls they made during the Great Moderation, they neglected creating an insurance fund large enough to cover what they were insuring, which would have been impossible given the sums involved. Instead, they raised the salaries and bonus of the firm's executive, and paid higher dividends to its shareholders. The investment section of the firm thus became insolvent during the 2008 financial crisis.

The Federal Reserve Bank of New York bailed out AIG by providing an emergency credit liquidity facility of up to $85 billion, which were then repaid by selling off assets of the company. After assessing that a disorderly failure of AIG could worsen the current financial and economic crisis, and at the request of AIG, the Federal Reserve Bank of New York intervened. The Federal Reserve required a 79.9 percent equity stake as a fee for service and to compensate for the risk of the loan to AIG. Presidential candidate Barack Obama supported this bailout at the time, along with most of Congress, who adopted the Bailout Bill that enabled it.

== Responses from politicians ==
On the wake of the scandal, President Barack Obama said, "[I]t's hard to understand how derivative traders at AIG warranted any bonuses, much less $165 million in extra pay. How do they justify this outrage to the taxpayers who are keeping the company afloat?" and "In the last six months, AIG has received substantial sums from the U.S. Treasury. I’ve asked Secretary Geithner to use that leverage and pursue every legal avenue to block these bonuses and make the American taxpayers whole."

Politicians on both sides of Congress reacted with outrage to the planned bonus payments. Senator Chuck Grassley (Republican, Iowa) said "I would suggest the first thing that would make me feel a little bit better toward them if they'd follow the Japanese example and come before the American people and take that deep bow and say, I'm sorry, and then either do one of two things: resign or go commit suicide." Senator Chuck Schumer (Democrat, New York) accused AIG of "Alice in Wonderland business practices" and said "It boggles the mind." Senator Richard Shelby (Republican, Alabama) said "These people brought this on themselves. Now you're rewarding failure. A lot of these people should be fired, not awarded bonuses. This is horrible. It's outrageous." Senator Mitch McConnell (Republican, Kentucky) echoed his comments, saying "This is an outrage." Senator Jon Tester (Democrat, Montana) said "This is ridiculous." and AIG executives "need to understand that the only reason they even have a job is because of the taxpayers." Senator Dick Durbin (Democrat, Illinois) said "I've had it." and "The fact that they continue to do it while we pour in billions of dollars is undefensible." Representative Paul Hodes (Democrat, New Hampshire) said "I think AIG now stands for arrogance, incompetence and greed."

Representative Barney Frank (Democrat, Massachusetts), Chairman of the House Financial Services Committee, said paying these bonuses would be "rewarding incompetence" and "These people may have a right to their bonuses. They don't have a right to their jobs forever." Representative Mark Kirk (Republican, Illinois) said "AIG should not be on welfare from Uncle Sam, and yet paying bonuses and transferring a considerable amount of taxpayer funds to entities overseas." Federal Reserve Chairman Ben Bernanke said "It makes me angry. I slammed the phone more than a few times on discussing AIG." Lawrence Summers, Director of the National Economic Council, said "The easy thing would be to just say, you know, ‘Off with their heads,’ and violate the contracts." Austan Goolsbee, of the Council of Economic Advisers said "I don't know why they would follow a policy that's really not sensible, is obviously going to ignite the ire of millions of people." and "You worry about that backlash."

Representative Barney Frank said "I do want to stress, this initial intervention into AIG was not part of the congressional rescue plan.", "Before we were even asked by the Bush administration to do the rescue plan, President Bush's two top economic appointees Mr. Bernanke and Mr. Paulson came to us and said--Mr. Bernanke, as head of the Federal Reserve is going to lend $85 billion (~$121 billion in 2024) to AIG under a statute that dates back to 1932. They didn't ask us. They didn't solicit our opinion. They simply informed us.", and "Since then, when we have voted, we have put tough conditions on. And, in fact, this won't be happening again. The conditions are so tough that there have been articles recently in The Washington Post and The New York Times from banks complaining that we've made the conditions so tough they are going to give us our money back."

Representative Thaddeus McCotter (R-Michigan) said in a speech to Congress, "Every single Democrat in this House that voted for that bill voted to approve and protect those AIG bonuses." Senator Jim Inhofe (R-Oklahoma) said that much of the blame for the bonuses should be directed at the 74 Senators who voted for the bailout, "... including now President Obama, who voted in favor of handing over an unprecedented amount of money and power to an unelected bureaucrat last August."

=== Tax on bonuses ===
On March 19, 2009, the House of Representatives approved, by a vote of 328 to 93, a measure to levy a 90% tax on bonuses awarded by corporations receiving more than $5 billion (~$7.08 billion in 2024) in Treasury aid from the Troubled Asset Relief Program (TARP). The House bill affects individuals who make $250,000 (~$356,558 in 2024) or more in total household income and bonuses paid or scheduled to be paid after December 31, 2008. The Senate version of the bill is similar to the House bill except it will levy a 70% tax on bonuses awarded by corporations that are receiving any amount of Treasury aid from the Troubled Asset Relief Program (TARP). The 70% tax will be paid through a 35% excise tax on the corporation and 35% tax on the receiver of the bonus.

Some commentators suggested that such a tax would run into constitutional problems, because Article 1, Section 9 of the U.S. Constitution prohibits Congress from enacting bill of attainder and ex post facto laws. However, Laurence Tribe, quoted in the blog of The Wall Street Journal, said that there were no insoluble constitutional difficulties. The New York Times quoted experts on constitutional and tax law having said it was likely the House bill could pass muster. Numerous court rulings have upheld retroactive tax provisions, particularly over short periods (The House bill applies back only to January 1, 2009). The measure is also strengthened by the fact that it does not apply to just one company or group of individuals, and does not take aim only at past bonuses paid in 2009 but also bonuses to be paid in future.

In a March 22, 2009 Wall St. Journal editorial, Jonathan Clements, a Citi employee, wrote, "... by mid-October, I will hit $250,000 in total income -- and have no incentive to earn any more income in 2009. At that point, I plan to ask Citi for an unpaid sabbatical." He also argues that some individuals have already received and spent most of their bonuses and will not be able to afford the tax.

A March 24, 2009 CNN article said that an objection to this proposal is that private companies wouldn't feel comfortable doing business with the U.S. government if they thought the government would change the rules after the contracts have already been signed. A March 26, 2009 Associated Press article stated, "Obama then warned the public against vilifying investors and entrepreneurs who are needed to keep the economy alive."

In response to this criticism, Senate majority leader Harry Reid's spokesperson said that "in light of the significant concerns raised by President Obama and Senate Republicans, we've decided to take a step back and discuss any possible next steps." House majority leader Steny Hoyer argued that the tax "may not be necessary" because of the repayment of bonuses. He added "I think our bill apparently had the effect of focusing their attention on that issue.... Whether or not it becomes law is another question."

In the end, no tax on TARP bonuses was ever signed into law by President Obama. The following year, Obama raised the idea of taxing TARP bonuses while campaigning for the 2010 United States elections. However, there was little chance that Congress would be inclined to adopt such a tax at that time.

=== Restriction on base compensation ===
Congressman Brad Sherman introduced a bill to restrict base salaries of employees of firms who have taken $5 billion or more in the Troubled Asset Relief Program by taxing all non-bonus compensation over $500,000. It is designed to tax all compensations, including all payments that may be "re-named" bonuses to ensure that individuals and firms will not escape the bonus tax. This bill also did not make it into law.

== Media commentary ==
Political commentators and journalists have expressed an equally bipartisan outrage. Commentator Charles Krauthammer said "I would deny them the bonuses if possible. I would be for an exemplary hanging or two. Have it in Times Square, invite Madame Defarge. You borrow a guillotine from the French and we could have a party." Mort Kondracke, another conservative commentator, said "I was going to recommend boiling in oil in Times Square." MSNBC host Rachel Maddow said "Sometime in early 2008, that company signed contracts with its employees that said: 'Even if you cause the company to fail and nearly bring down the worldwide financial system, you will still get a bonus.' I mean, who writes those contracts?" Chuck Todd, also an MSNBC commentator, wrote that "It's a lynch mob out there, and members of Congress seem to be carrying torches." Comedy Central host Jon Stewart said "You know, they say angry populism is all the rage. Literally, it's been building for months, simmering. Our proletarian rage feels so unfocused. If only someone would step up and put on the kick me sign." and "They're not good people." The New Jersey Star-Ledger editorial page read "This band of "best and brightest" just blew a $62 billion hole in the company. What's to retain? Heads should be rolling. Besides, is there really that much cutthroat competition for such an overpaid bunch of losers?"

CNN reporter Carol Costello said "Some political analysts fear public anger has reached a tipping point." Commentator William Kristol wrote "Can capitalism survive the behavior of some capitalists? It's always been an open question. But if capitalism is to survive, shouldn't the Republican party, the party that defends democratic capitalism, be particularly vehement in denouncing its excesses? Isn't this a pretty spectacular one?" Robert Lenzer wrote in Forbes that "The $170 billion bailout of AIG and the $165 million bonus outrage are the result of reckless behavior by AIG and most especially by its egomaniacal former chairman, Maurice "Hank" Greenberg. This supposed paragon of higher finance was just plain playing Russian roulette with his shareholders' money, destroying nearly $200 billion in equity and putting an onerous cost on Uncle Sam and taxpayers." Lenzer accused AIG and Greenberg of "cowboy capitalism", "numbskull ... tomfoolery", and "rotten arrogance." Karim Bardeesy, writing in Slate, compared AIG to Imperial Japan and Nazi Germany, stating "Sometimes the internal workings of a society are so rotten that it takes a complete outsider to come in and change the culture and the cultural production within it. Allies came in and rewrote constitutions for the corrupted societies in Japan and Germany after World War II."

MSNBC host Keith Olbermann said "Certainly, we can screw these guys out of these bonuses the way they screwed us." He has labeled the bonuses "failure bonuses" and "failure rewards." George Washington University law professor Jonathan Turley said "I have some question about fraud here. I mean, these contracts seem to have been written in haste when the company could not possibly have honored them short of a bailout." Turley also said that there is "real social unrest" and that "Congress has finally pushed this country to the breaking point." John Kelso wrote in the Austin American-Statesman that "irate Americans...are about to start chasing these guys around the castle the way the townsfolk with the torches went after Frankenstein" and "The gated communities these suits live in are gated for a reason. For when the revolution starts." He also wrote that AIG "really stands for America Is Gyped. Avarice Is Great, or Actually, It's Graft." Susan Antilla, reporting for Bloomberg, wrote that "The public is angry. They are steaming, off-with-their-heads mad at AIG and other financial companies for the greed and cheating that pushed us into a financial meltdown." and "Americans want to see heads roll." Fred J. Joseph, commissioner of the Colorado division of securities and president of the North American Securities Administrators Association, said "If these people could get their hands on pitchforks, they really would storm the castle."

The Washington Post reported that "Hired guards stood watch outside the suburban Connecticut offices of AIG Financial Products, the division whose exotic derivatives brought the insurance giant to the brink of collapse last year. Inside, death threats and angry letters flooded e-mail inboxes. Irate callers lit up the phone lines. Senior managers submitted their resignations. Some employees didn't show up at all." The paper quoted one anonymous AIG executive as saying "It's a mob effect. It's putting people's lives in danger." and another as saying "It's going to blow up. I have a horrible, horrible, horrible feeling that this is going to end badly." The Associated Press quoted another anonymous AIG executive as saying "It's scary. People are very, very nervous for their security." The AP reported that "police cars that now regularly patrol the well-kept streets" of a neighborhood of AIG executives. AIG has advised employees "to avoid wearing the company logo" and "to travel in pairs at night and park in well-lit areas." Reuters quoted an anonymous senior equity salesman at a bank receiving TARP funds as saying "At this point, it's like the French Revolution -- the mob has got the banks' heads in the guillotine."

NBC Connecticut, through the Freedom of Information Act, obtained information about dozens of death threats that were made to employees of AIG and their families. Some of the people who made the threats left their email addresses and phone numbers, making it much easier for law enforcement officials to identify them.

In an online editorial for The Wall Street Journal, James Taranto speculated that for bonus recipients living in New York City, if the 90% bonus tax passed by the United States House of Representatives is added to the Medicare FICA tax of 1.45%, plus the state and local taxes of 6.85% and 3.648%, respectively, it adds up to a tax rate of 101.948%. This means the individual receiving the bonus will have to pay more than he or she 'received' from the bonus.

In a nationally syndicated opinion column, economist Thomas Sowell claimed that the politicians who did the most to create the situation that led to the use of taxpayer money to fund the bonuses are now the same ones who are complaining the most about the bonuses. Sowell also wrote, "If members of Congress can't be bothered to read the laws they pass, then they have no basis for whipping up lynch mob outrage against people who did read the law and acted within the law."

Mike Cassidy of the San Jose Mercury News wrote that the bonuses bring "a whole new meaning to the phrase 'bank robber.'" He also wrote "These bankers and brokers and investing Svengalis knew exactly how their obscene cash-grabbing orgy would look to the rest of us. They just didn't care."

== Response by state officials ==
On March 16, 2009, New York State Attorney General Andrew Cuomo sent a letter to AIG demanding "the list of individuals who are to receive payments" and "a description of each individual's job description and performance at AIG Financial Products" in order to determine "whether any of the individuals receiving such payments were involved in the conduct that led to AIG's demise and subsequent bailout" and "whether, as you claim, such individuals are truly required to unwind AIG Financial Product's positions." AIG failed to respond, so Cuomo subpoenaed them for the names of the bonus recipients. Cuomo announced that 73 AIG employees were each paid more than $1 million in bonuses, saying "AIG made more than 73 millionaires in the unit which lost so much money that it brought the firm to its knees, forcing a taxpayer bailout." and "Something is deeply wrong with this outcome."

On March 21, Connecticut Attorney General Richard Blumenthal issued a subpoena to AIG to find out why they gave out an additional $53 million in bonuses on top of the $165 million already reported.

== Bonuses exempted in TARP ==
On February 14, 2009, the Wall Street Journal published an article, Bankers Face Strict New Pay Cap, discussing a retroactive limit to bonus compensation inserted by Chris Dodd into the TARP bill that passed in the Senate. The same article went on to mention that Treasury Secretary Timothy Geithner and Lawrence Summers "had called Sen. Dodd and asked him to reconsider".

On March 17, 2009, Fox Business Network's Rich Edson first reported Senator Chris Dodd included a provision exempting such bonuses from the executive pay limits clause of the TARP. When the bill left conference, Dodd's provision had been removed and replaced with the explicit exemptions lobbied for by Geithner and Summers.

As Dodd explained in his March 18 interview on CNN, at Geithner and the Obama Administration's insistence he removed the language he had himself inserted and replaced it with Geithner and Summers' loophole, which thus allowed the bonuses which formed the basis for the AIG scandal.

Dodd retreated from his original statement that he did not know how the bill was changed. Dodd was criticised by many in the Connecticut media for the apparent flip-flop. In a March 20, 2009 editorial the New Haven Register called Dodd "a lying weasel" The same day, Hartford Courant columnist Rick Green called on Dodd not to seek re-election in 2010. In January 2010, Dodd announced that he would not run for re-election.

== AIG's response and counter-responses ==
AIG has defended the bonuses by citing contractual obligations. AIG also claims that only their executives can unwind their complex derivative deals. Rick Newman of U.S. News & World Report argues that this is tantamount to extortion. MSNBC host David Shuster said "The argument that these were so-called retention bonuses is undermined by the fact that 52 of the people who received them have already left the company."

Few people outside of AIG itself have defended AIG's payments of the bonuses. Former White House Press Secretary under the George W. Bush administration Dana Perino defended AIG, saying "If they don't get it [the bonus], maybe they won't be motivated enough to try to help the company turn around." and accusing the "rhetoric in Washington" of "demonizing people". Terence Corcoran, writing in the Financial Post, claims that AIG is innocent, and instead "massive government failure" on the part of Barack Obama, whom Corcoran claims "doesn't get it," is at fault. Evan Newmark of The Wall Street Journal accused those attacking AIG of "hysterical, bloodthirsty ravings" and "populist hurly-burly." Andrew Ross Sorkin of The New York Times argued the case for paying bonuses, saying there was likely some truth to AIG's claim that it needed to retain its top talent, and that its most talented employees could find employment elsewhere. Sorkin also said not paying the bonuses could spark problems across the business community. "If you think this economy is a mess now, imagine what it would look like if the business community started to worry that the government would start abrogating contracts left and right," wrote Sorkin. Joshua Zumbrun of Forbes and Eliot Spitzer of Slate argued that the outrage over bonuses distracted from a larger issue: that AIG had taken much of the bailout money and used it to settle contracts with its counterparties, Wall Street banks, hedge funds and non-U.S. banks, at full price.

Conservative political commentator Rush Limbaugh defended AIG, saying "We've got peasants with their pitchforks phoning in death threats at AIG. We have members of the United States Senate and the United States House of Representatives sounding like communist dictators." Limbaugh's comments defended that the bonuses were legal and productive, saying "This money went to American citizens. This money went mostly to American citizens who are registered Democrats. These people who got the bonus are going to spend it. That's called private sector stimulus...The ones who got the bonuses did so on the basis of sales success. These were reported as merit bonuses that they are contractually permitted to get. If you violate their contract, if you don't give them their bonus, you have got a lawsuit on your hands and 80% of this company is now owned by Barney Frank and Chris Dodd and [Nancy] Pelosi, and so they would be sued, the government would be sued by these people."

=== Repayment of bonuses ===
AIG CEO Edward M. Liddy told Congress that he asked employees who received bonuses over $100,000 to give half back. David Shuster said "That sounded half-assed to members of Congress who were both channeling and deflecting voter outrage." Liddy was joined by New York Attorney General Andrew Cuomo in requesting these repayments.

AIG has pointed out that Connecticut, the state where AIG is based, has a law called the Wage Act. According to the law, employers who don't pay employees the money which they are contractually obligated to pay, could ultimately be required to pay twice that amount.

As of March 23, 2009, 9 of the 10 highest paid AIG executives had agreed to give back their bonuses to the company - and of the 20 highest paid, 15 had agreed to give back their bonuses. Most of the employees who accepted to pay back their bonuses were Americans. Non-American AIG employees strongly objected to repaying their bonuses, and some considered the request to be "blackmail", "extortion" and a "potentially illegal" mean for the company to take back money that was contractually the employees'. They feared that New York Attorney General Andrew Cuomo, who had opened an investigation of the bonus payments, would reveal their name if they refused to give their bonuses back.

Following the announcement of the repayment of bonuses, house majority leader Steny Hoyer argued that a tax on these bonuses like the one that was adopted by the House a week prior "may not be necessary".

== Jake DeSantis's resignation ==
On March 24, 2009, The New York Times printed the open letter of resignation of Jake DeSantis, an executive vice president of AIG's financial products unit, to Edward M. Liddy, the chief executive of AIG. DeSantis stated that he and the majority of AIG-F.P. employees had nothing to do with the money-losing credit default swaps, that many of them had lost much of their savings in the form of deferred compensation invested in the capital of AIG-F.P., that he and others had agreed to work for an annual salary of $1 out of a sense of duty to the company, that AIG-F.P. employees were assured many times following the government bailout in September 2008 that AIG would honor the pre-existing retention contracts with scheduled payments to be made in March 2009, and that AIG-F.P. employees believed they were let down by Liddy's lack of support against opportunistic political pressure. He also stated he was going to donate his March 2009 payment to those suffering from the global economic downturn.
