= Fallbacka =

Farm in Vantaa, southern Finland

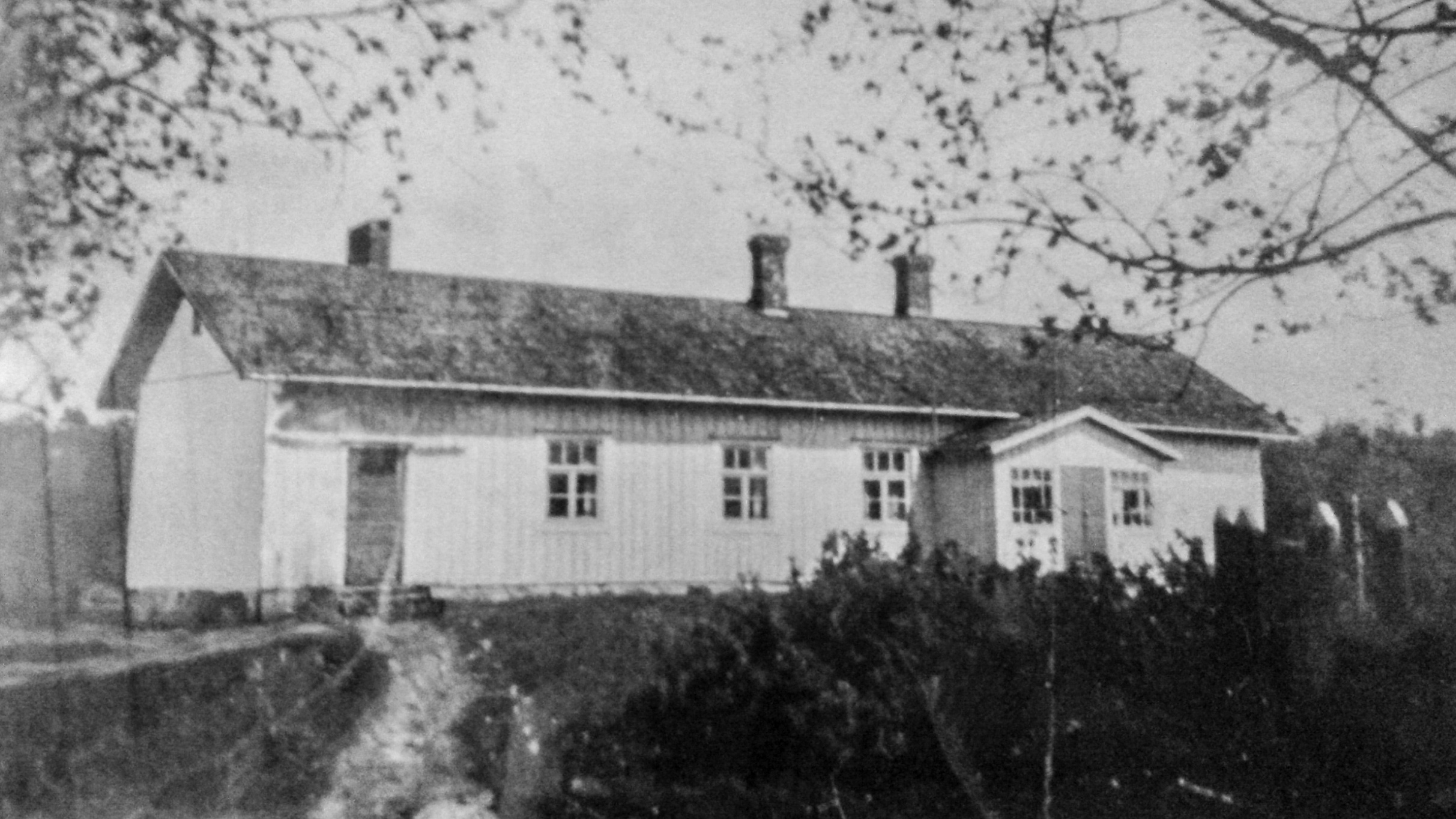
Fallbacka main building

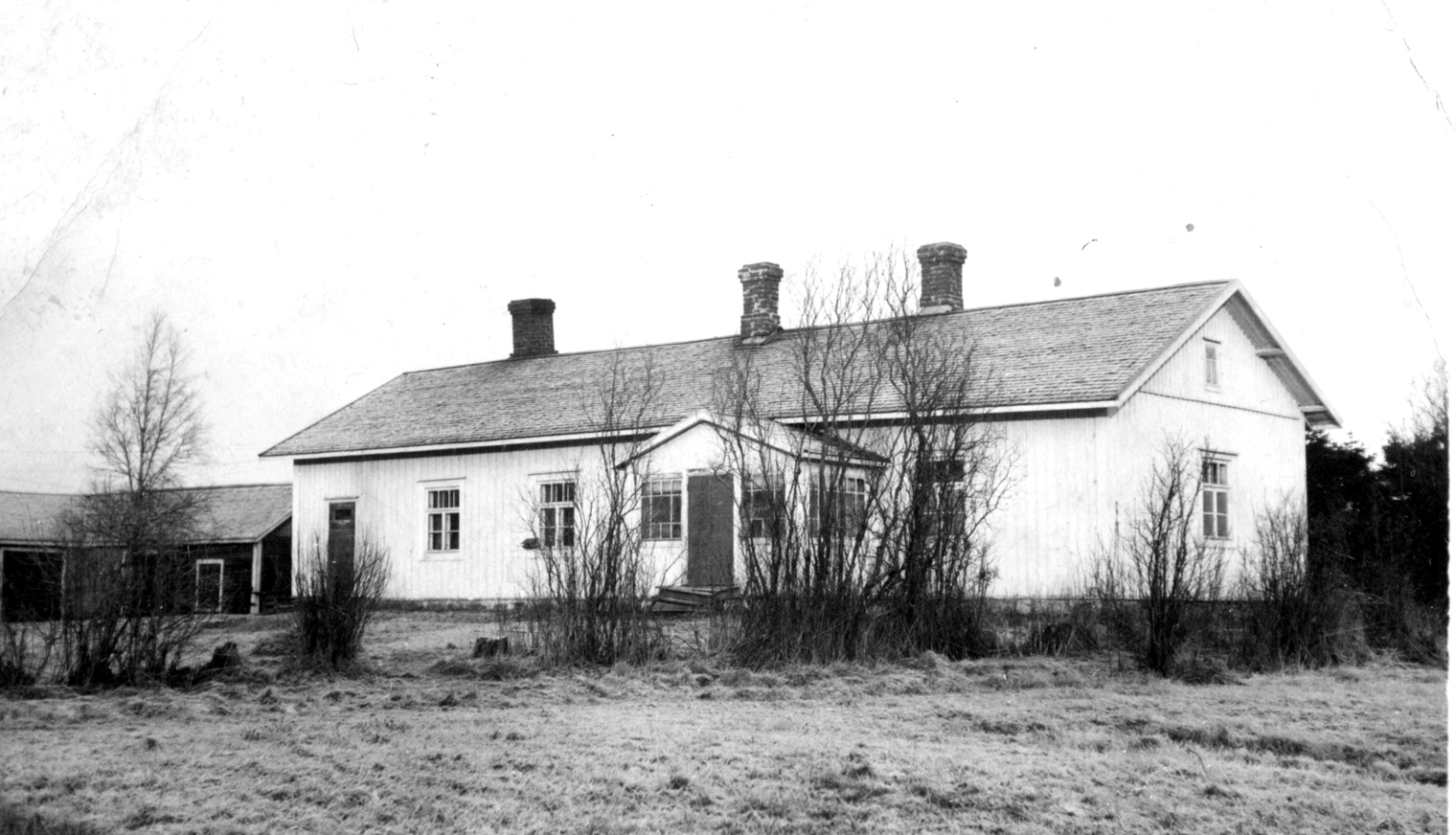
Fallbacka main building seen from south east

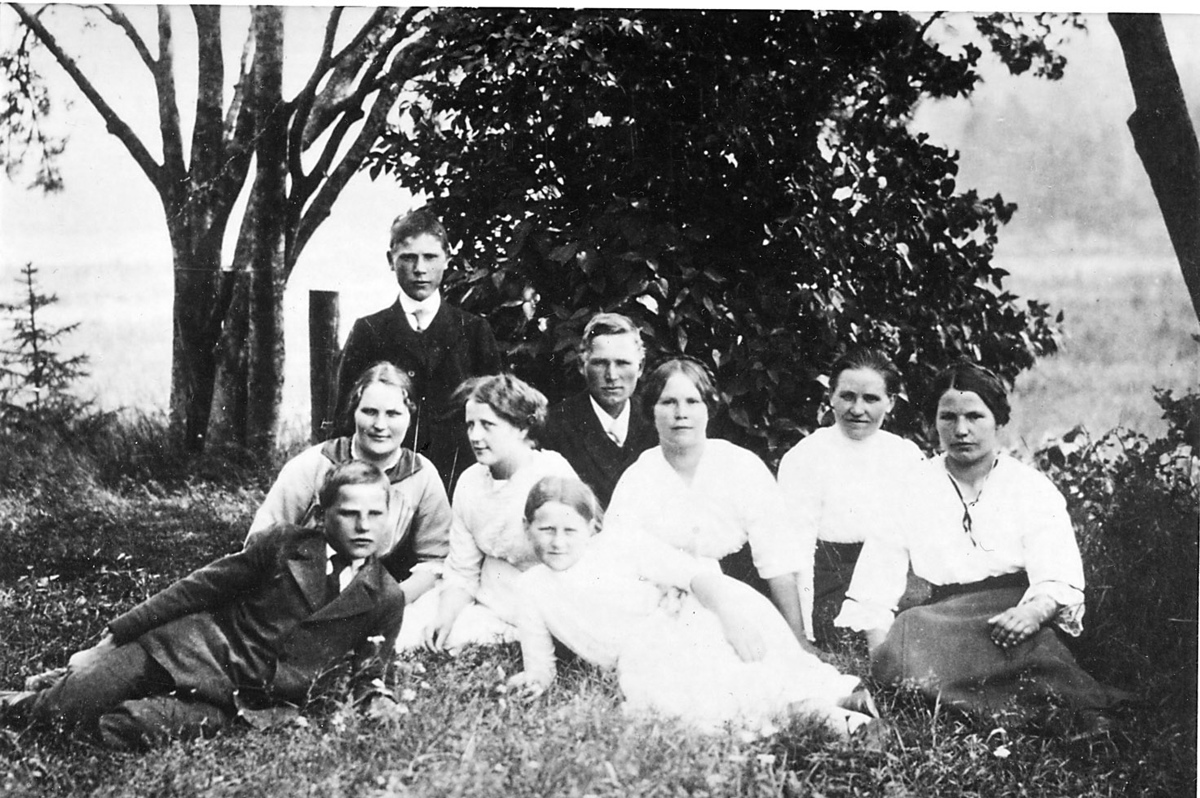
Fallström siblings 1914 at Fallbacka

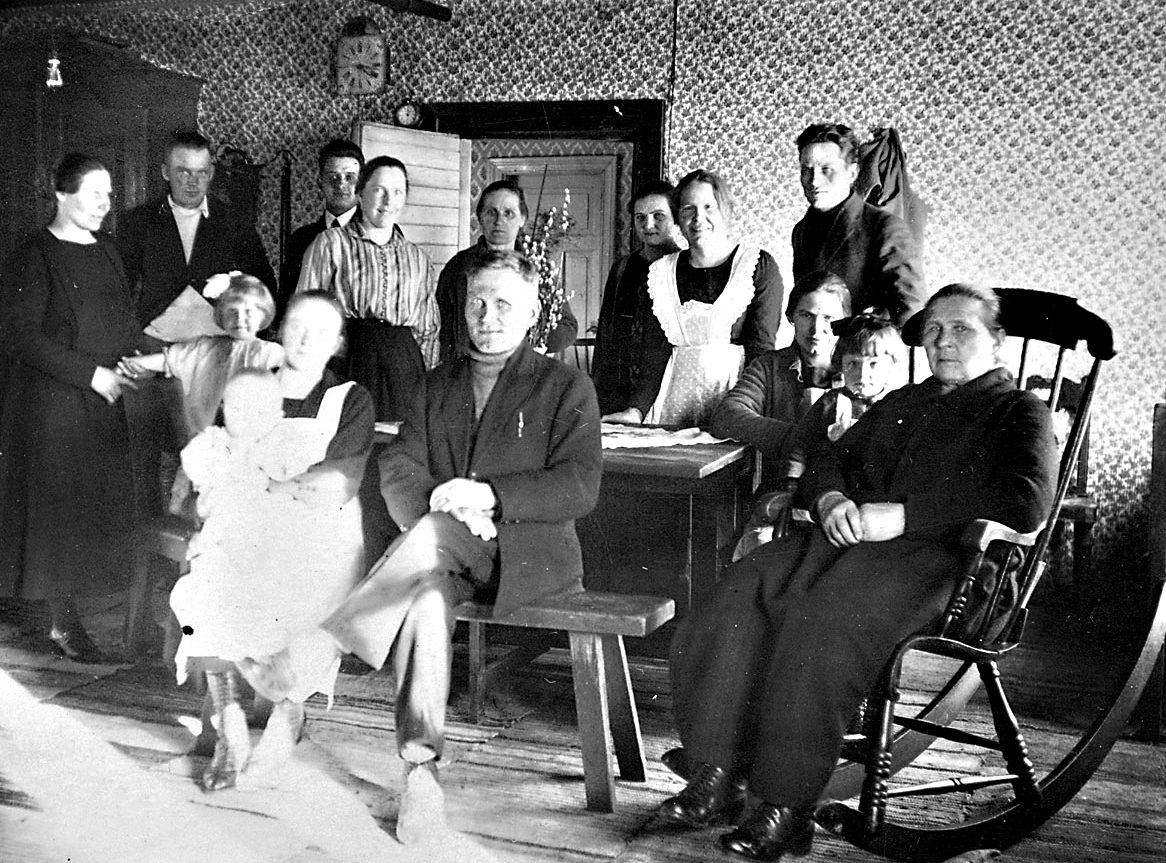
Axel Fallström with family 1926 at Fallbacka

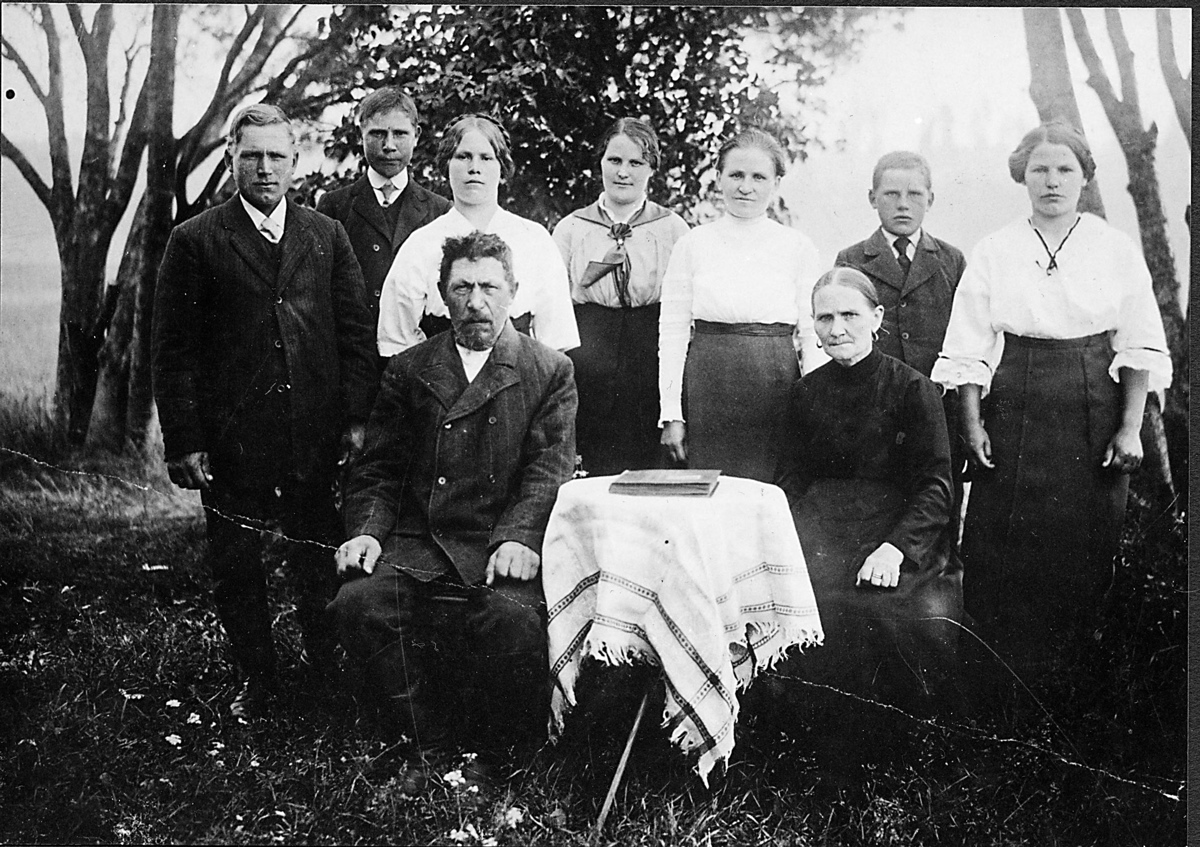
Fredrik Victor Fallström with family 1914

Fallbacka Farm was located in Tuusula (Finland) in the area where present-day Vantaa, Kerava and Tuusula meet, by the main railway of Finland, between the stations in Korso and Savio. The farm and the main building were inhabited by the farmer family Fallström. There is evidence at least dating back to the 18th century. The main building of the farm, which was at the highest point in the area, that hosted the first school in the area, was demolished in the 1960s. Nowadays, in the area are, for example. Rudolf Steiner School in Vantaa and private residences.

Through the area in the east–west direction there is on the Vantaa side Anttila-road which continues on the Tuusula side as Fallbacka-road, which was the old name for Anttila-road before the area was merged with Vantaa. In the north–south direction the area is divided by the Fallbäcken creek (Vallinoja), which over the years has decreased from a stream to a creek.

Since the 1990s, new construction has been added to the area. The area's western and southwestern part has started to be called Fallbäcken (Vallinoja). The part of the former farm that now belongs to Vantaa is now part of the Korso larger area. A large part constitutes a nature conservation area.

The northern part of the area belongs to "Alikeravan kylä" area and the northwestern part of Tuusula.
