= Antila =

Antila is a Finnish surname. Notable people with the surname include:

- John Antila (1902–1969), American businessman and politician
- Juho Erkki Antila (1856–1920), Finnish politician
- Kirsi Antila (née Välimaa, born 1978), Finnish cross-country skier
- Kristian Antila (born 1980), Finnish ice hockey goaltender
- Pentti Antila (1926–1997), Finnish agronomist and politician
- Timo Antila (born 1980), Finnish biathlete
