= Anttila =

Anttila may refer to:

== Geography ==
- Anttila (Kouvola), a village in Kouvola, Finland
- Anttila (Lohja), a district in Lohja, Finland
- Anttila (Porvoo), a village in Porvoo, Finland
- Anttila (Rauma, Finland), a district in Rauma, Finland

== Surname ==
- Anttila (surname)

== Other ==
- Anttila (department store), a Finnish chain of department stores owned by Kesko from 1996 to 2015

== See also ==
- Hämeen-Anttila
