= Deutsche Werft =

German shipbuilder

Deutsche Werft AG
- Industry: Shipbuilding
- Predecessor: Reiherstieg Schiffswerfte & Maschinenfabrik
- Founded: 1918
- Founder: Albert Ballin
- Defunct: 1968
- Fate: Merged
- Successor: Howaldtswerke-Deutsche Werft
- Headquarters: Finkenwerder, Hamburg, Germany,
- Products: Ships

Diesel-electric motor vessel Wuppertal, built by Deutsche Werft for Hamburg America Line in 1936

Deutsche Werft (English: German Shipyard) was a shipbuilding company in Finkenwerder Rüschpark, Hamburg, Germany. It was founded in 1918 by Albert Ballin and with Gutehoffnungshütte (GHH), Allgemeine Elektricitäts-Gesellschaft (AEG) and Hamburg Amerikanische Packetfahrt Actien Gesellschaft (HAPAG) as investors.

== History ==
In peacetime, Deutsche Werft built merchant ships, such as the HAPAG turbo-electric cargo ships Antilla and Orizaba.

In World War II Deutsche Werft built 113 Type IX and XXIII U-boats for the Kriegsmarine. To this end, it operated three camps directly on the company premises (the Deutsche Werft construction site camp, Deutsche Werft Finkenwärder camp and the Rüschkanal Eastern workers' camp), was involved in five camps in the Finkenwerder district and six in the port area, as well as nine camps in the city area. In addition, there were the camps at the Reiherstiegwerft shipyard, which also belonged to Deutsche Werft.

In 1968 Deutsche Werft was merged and became part of Howaldtswerke-Deutsche Werft.

== Gallery ==
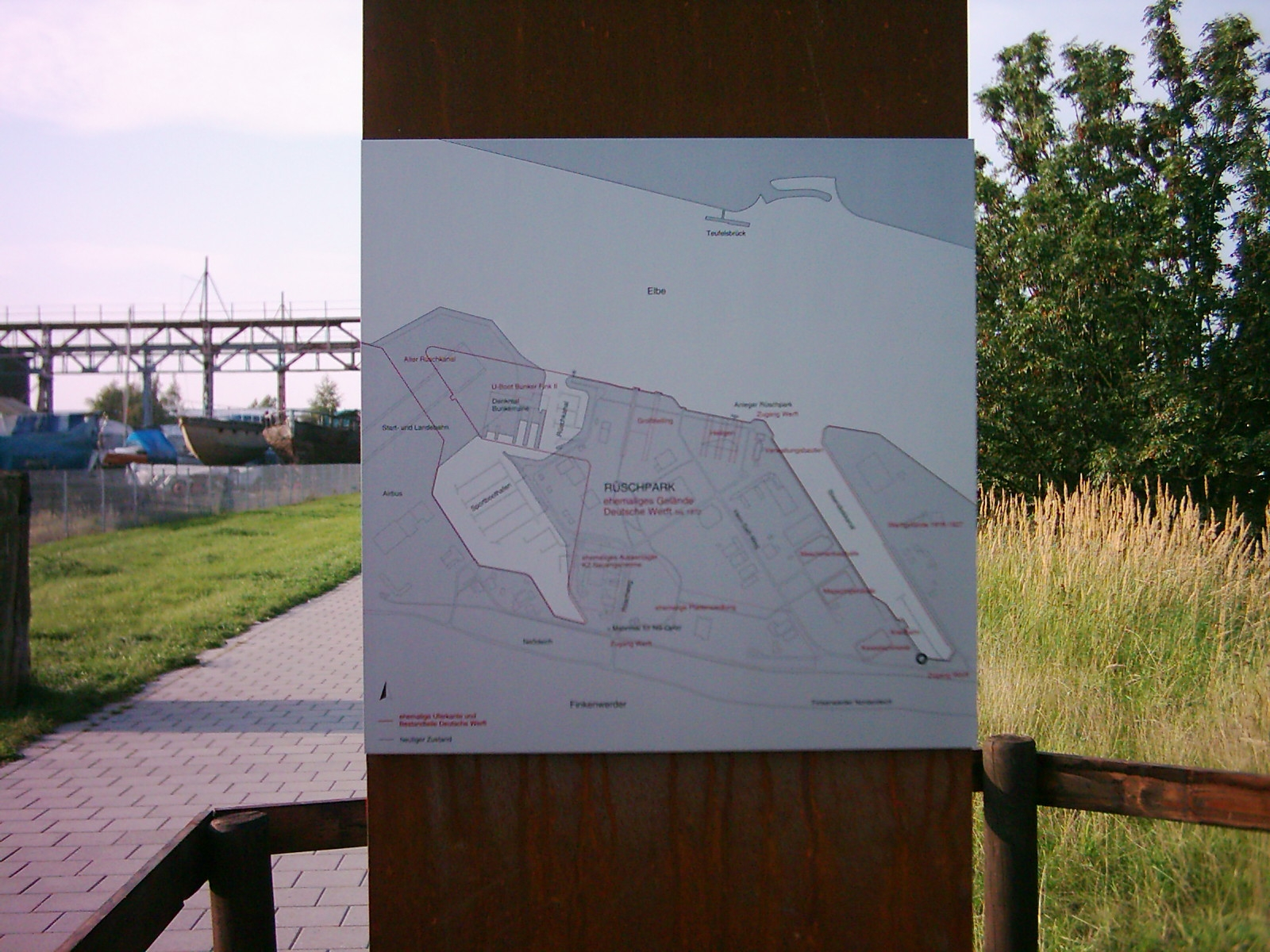
Rüschpark

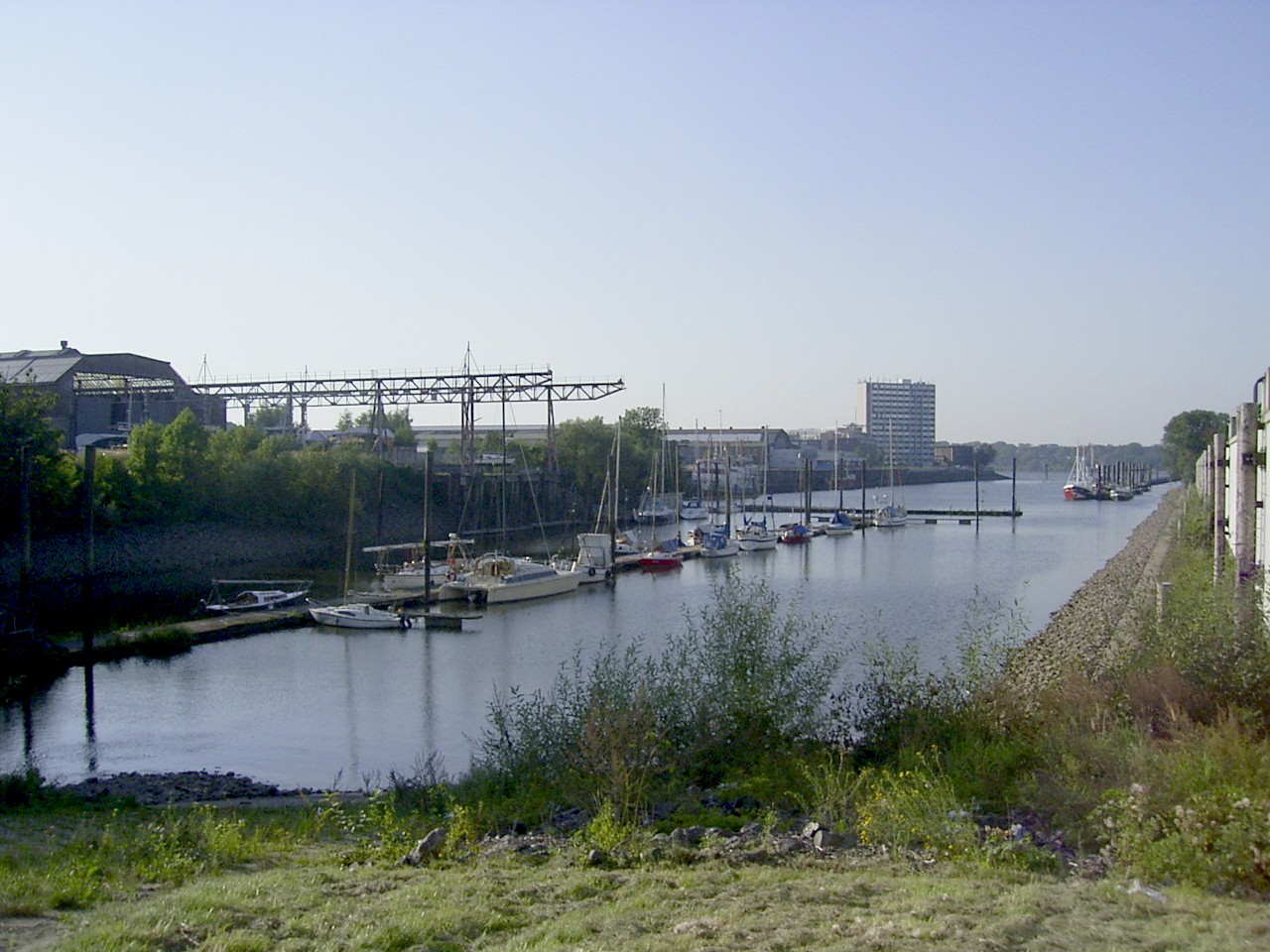
Yard in 2007

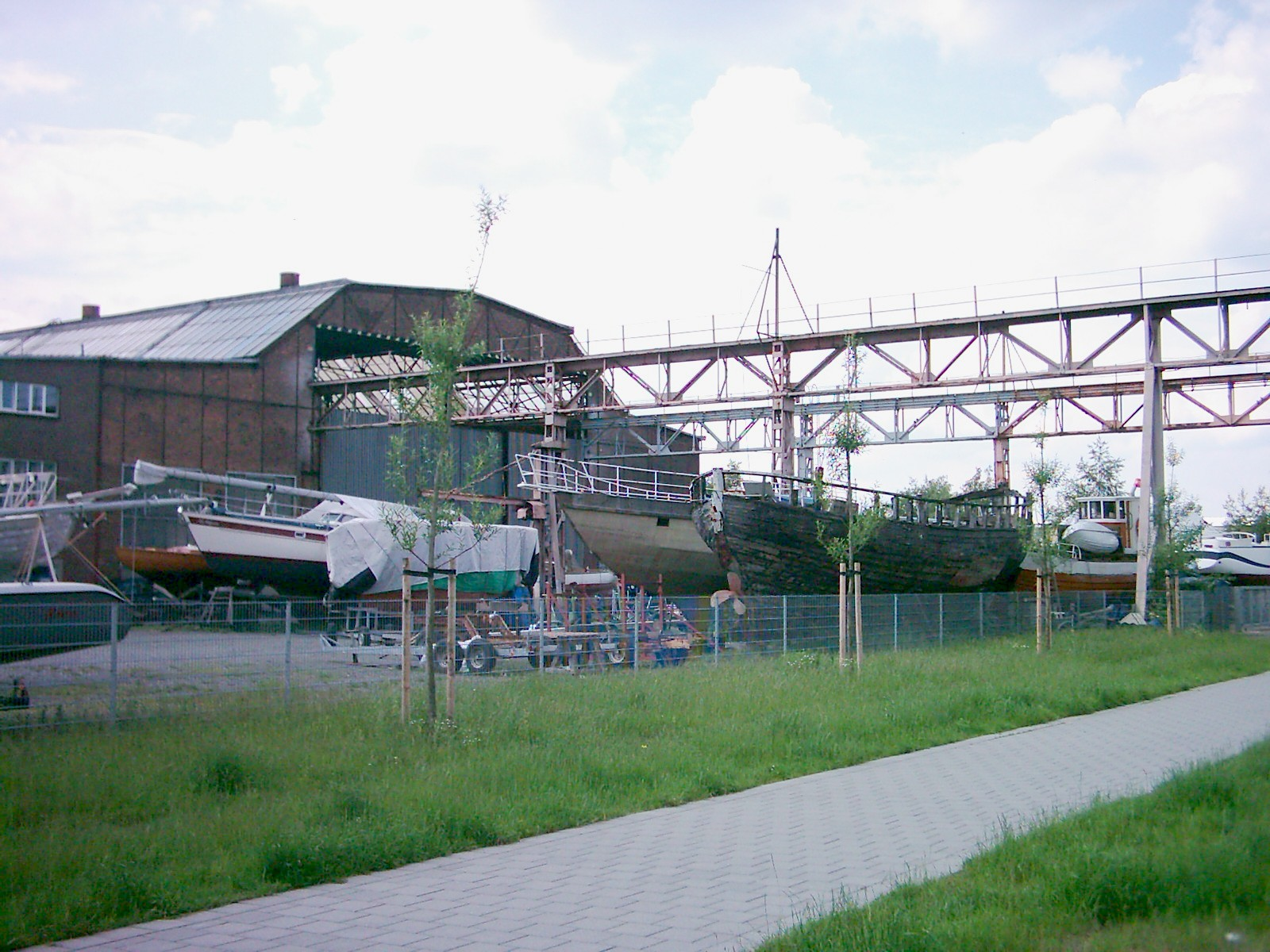
Yard Location

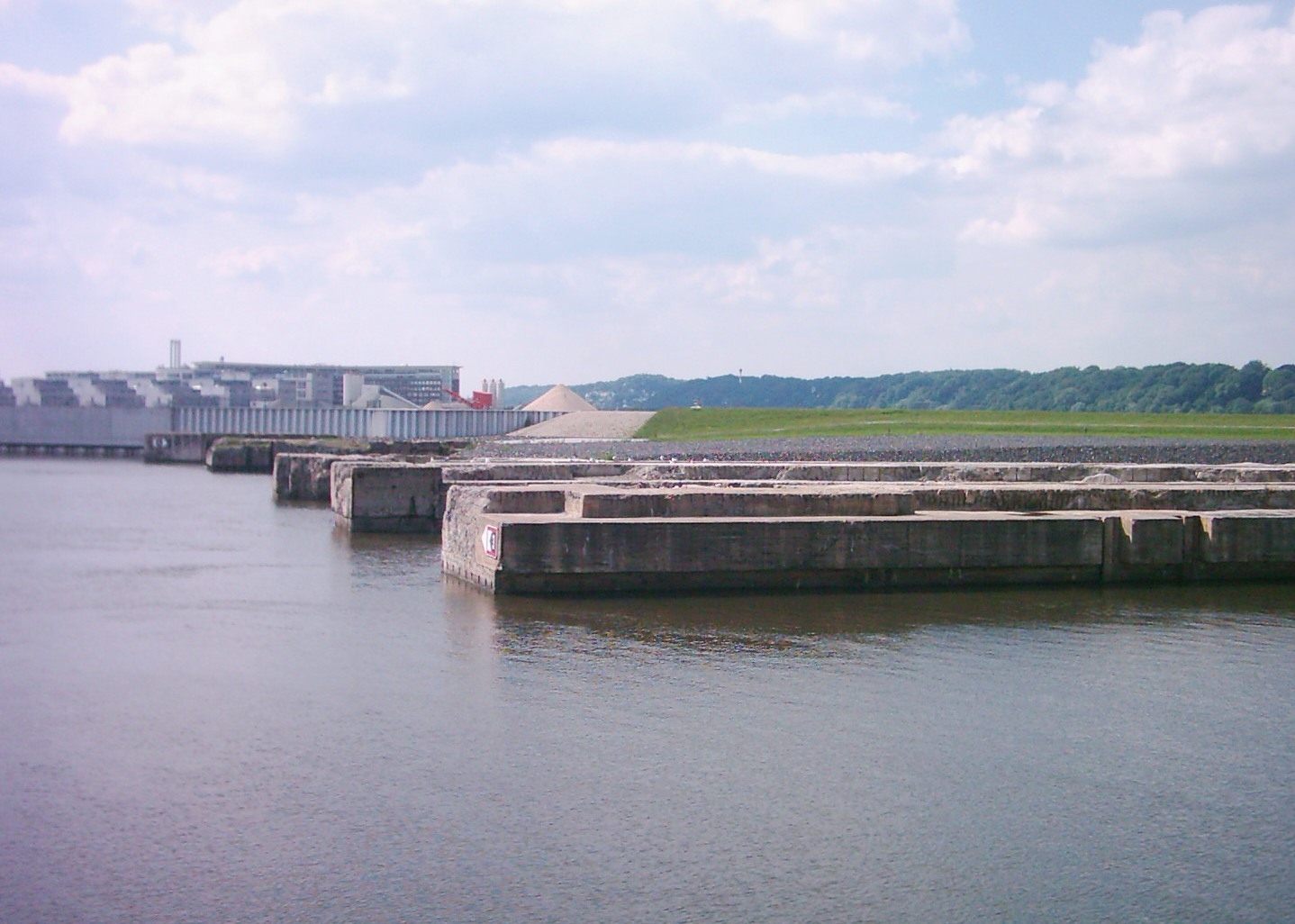
Detail of Submarine Construction Garage

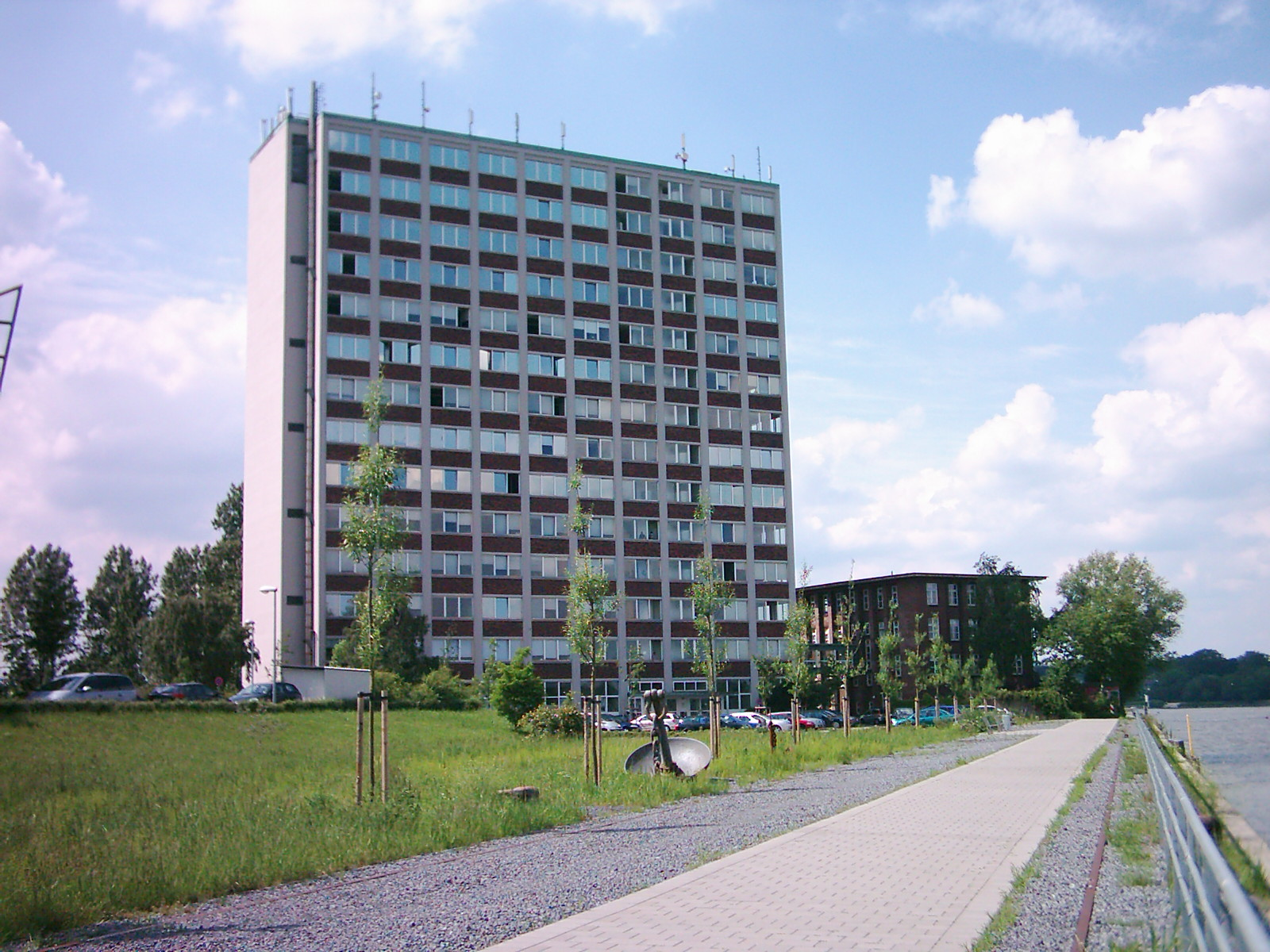
1958 Administrative Building, today third offices

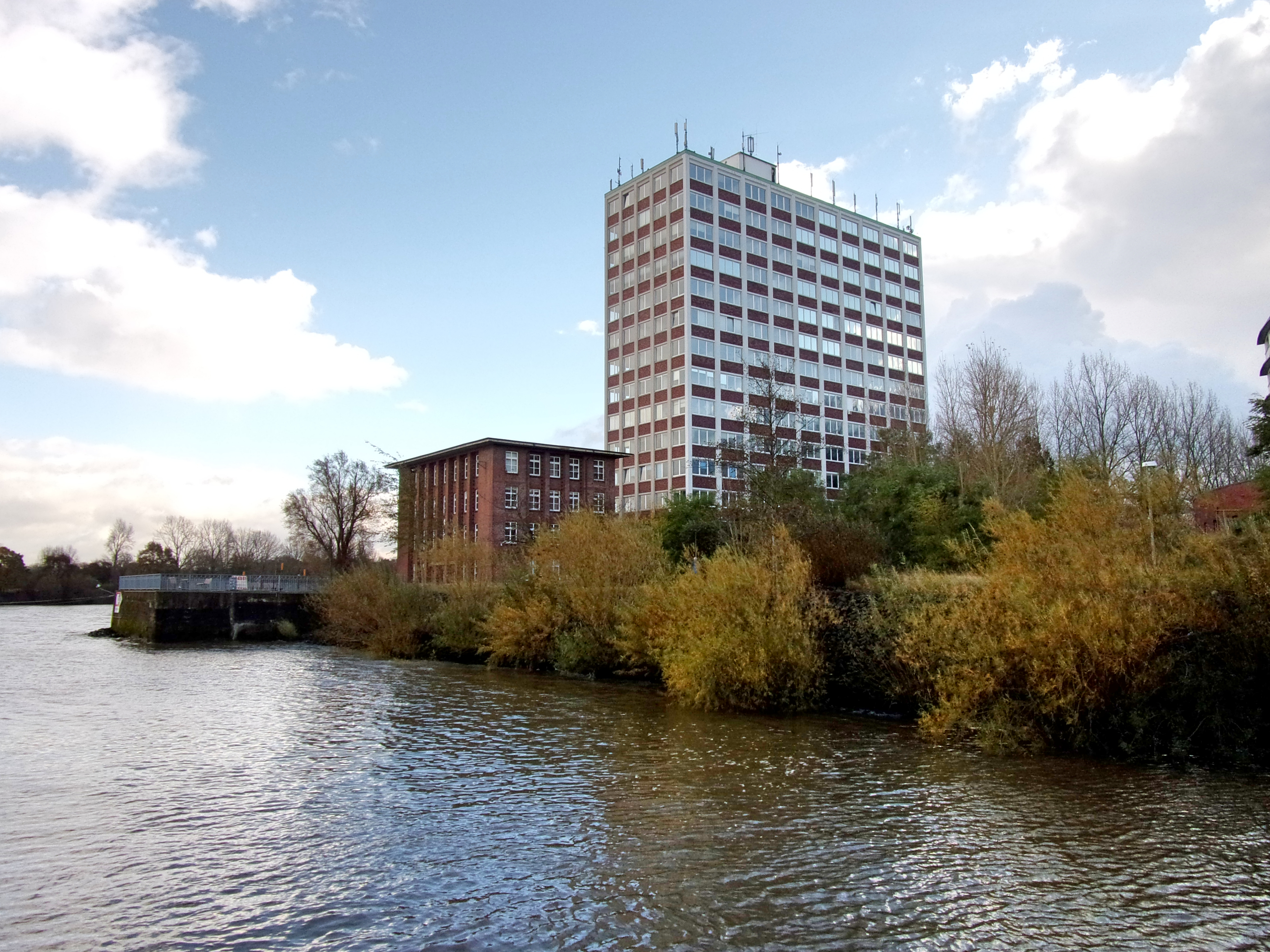
1958 Administrative Building, today third offices

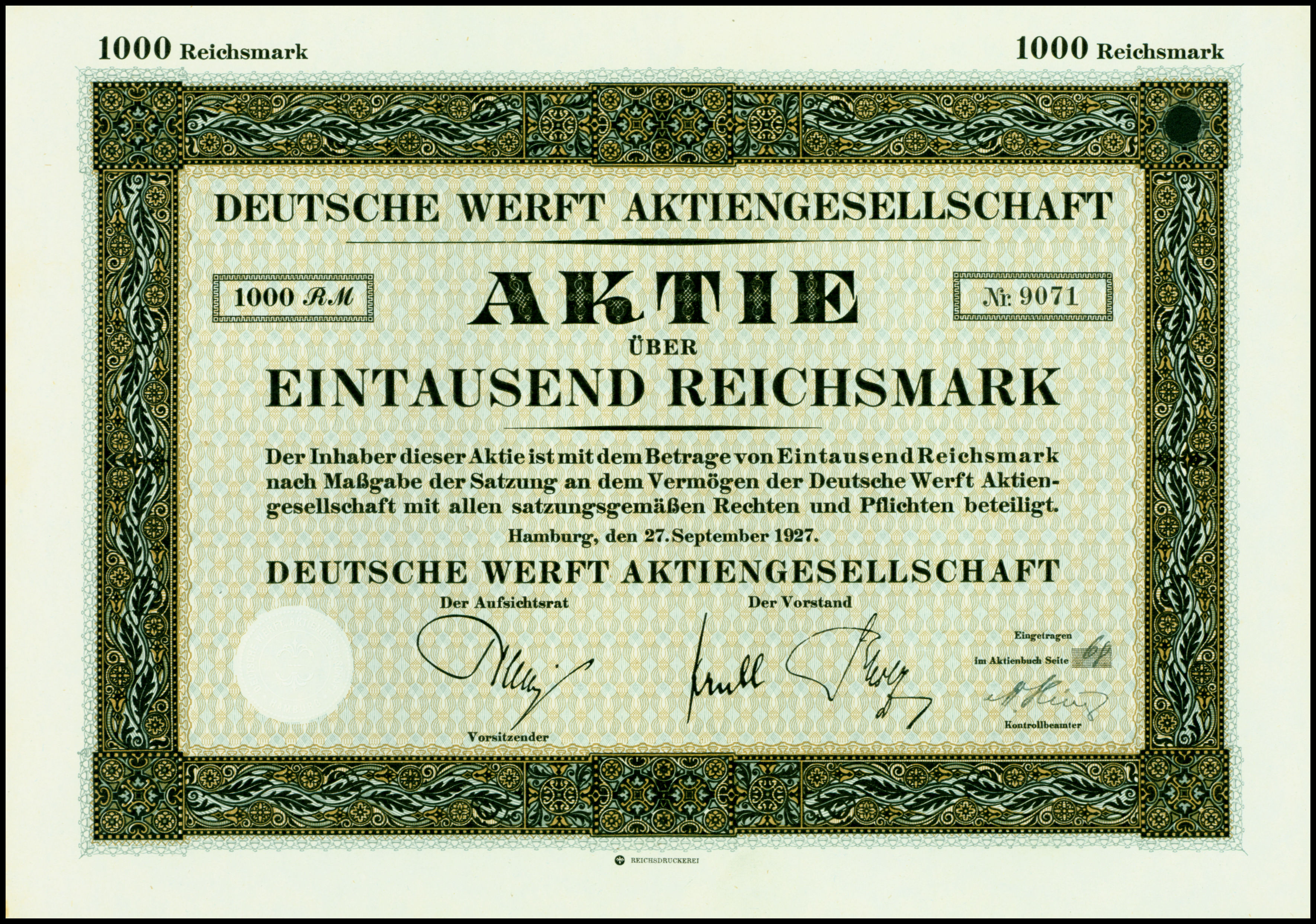
Share of the Deutsche Werft AG, issued 27. September 1927
