= Anttila (surname) =

Anttila is a Finnish surname. Notable people with the surname include:

- Akseli Anttila (1897–1953), Finnish-born Soviet general
- Bill Anttila (1919–2011), American water polo coach
- Erin Anttila (born 1977), Finnish singer
- Kalle Anttila (1887–1975), Finnish wrestler
- Liisa Anttila (born 1974), Finnish orienteer
- Marko Anttila (born 1985), Finnish ice hockey player
- Miikka Anttila (born 1972), Finnish rally co-driver
- Sirkka-Liisa Anttila (born 1943), Finnish politician
- Ulla Anttila (born 1963), Finnish politician

== See also ==
- Hämeen-Anttila, a compound surname
