= SS Orizaba (1939) =

Coordinates: 70°40′01″N 20°58′59″E

History

Nazi Germany
- Name: ES Orizaba
- Namesake: Orizaba, Mexico
- Owner: Hamburg America Line
- Operator: Hamburg America Line
- Port of registry: (Nazi Germany) Hamburg
- Route: Hamburg – Caribbean
- Builder: Deutsche Werft, Hamburg
- Launched: 11 February 1939
- Completed: 1939
- In service: 1939
- Out of service: 26 February 1940
- Homeport: Hamburg
- Fate: Ran aground, 26 February 1940

General characteristics
- Tonnage: 4,354 GRT
- Length: 398.3 ft (121.4 m)
- Beam: 55.7 ft (17.0 m)
- Depth: 22.8 ft (6.9 m)
- Propulsion: turbo-electric transmission; single screw
- Sensors & processing systems: direction finding; echo sounding
- Notes: sister ships: Antilla, Arauca

SS Orizaba (or "ES Orizaba", with "ES" standing for "Electroschiff" German: electric ship) was a Hamburg America Line (HAPAG) cargo ship that was built in Hamburg 1939 and wrecked off northern Norway in 1940.

Orizaba was built for trade between Germany and the Caribbean, and was named accordingly. Orizaba is a city in the Mexican state of Veracruz, on the coast of the Gulf of Mexico.

== Building ==
Orizaba was built in Hamburg and completed in 1939. She was one of three sister ships launched in 1939 for HAPAG. She and her sister Antilla were built by Deutsche Werft in Finkenwerder, Hamburg, while their sister Arauca was built by Bremer Vulkan in Bremen-Vegesack.

Orizaba and her sisters had turbo-electric transmission. Each ship had two oil-fired high pressure boilers that fed a single AEG turbo generator. This produced current for an AEG electric propulsion motor that drove a single propeller shaft. This was a sophisticated propulsion system that required skilled operation. Both Antilla and Arauca suffered technical failures on their maiden voyages to the Caribbean.

Orizaba and her sisters each had direction finding equipment and an echo sounding device.

== Career ==
In August 1939, a week before Germany invaded Poland, Germany signalled all her merchant ships to leave main shipping lanes, signal only in code, and to disguise their ships and return to Germany as soon as possible. Three days later Germany ordered that all merchant ships which could not reach Germany within four days should seek shelter in neutral ports. Orizaba was among a number that took refuge in Vigo in Spain, which was officially neutral.

On the night of 9/10 February 1940, a night with minimum moonlight, the German merchant ships Arucas, Morea, Orizaba, Rostock, Wahehe and Wangoni left Vigo to try to run the Allied blockade of Germany. In an attempt to avoid French Navy and Royal Navy patrols their course was to be out into the Atlantic and then north past neutral Iceland into the Norwegian Sea, where they would try to use neutral Norwegian territorial waters to reach the North Sea and then neutral Danish territorial waters to reach Germany.

Approximate position of Orizaba's wreck off northern Norway

On 11 February a Royal Navy destroyer captured Morea and a French sloop captured Rostock. On 21 February the Royal Navy cruiser HMS Manchester and two destroyers captured Wahehe southeast of Iceland as a prize ship. On 26 February 1940 Orizaba ran aground off the coast of Troms in northern Norway. The Finnish cargo ship Margareta rescued survivors. On 3 March the cruiser HMS York intercepted Arucas southeast of Iceland. Arucas' crew scuttled her and York rescued 39 of them, but another three were lost.

Only Wangoni made it back to Germany. On 28 February the submarine HMS Triton intercepted her off Kristiansand in southern Norway, but the cargo ship escaped under cover of darkness and on 1 March made port at Hamburg.

== Wreck ==
Orizaba remains a wreck in the Norwegian Sea.

When she foundered, the ship had mercury aboard. Accordingly, in 2008 Norway's National Institute of Nutrition and Seafood Research (NIFES) on behalf of the Norwegian Food Safety Authority tested cusk, blue mussel and whelk in the vicinity of the wreck for levels of heavy metals.

NIFES found that mercury levels in all three species were within European Food Safety Authority limits and that the levels in cusk and blue mussel were no higher than normal for those species. However, NIFES found that in blue mussel the concentration of cadmium was higher than normal, and in whelk it was between two and three times higher than levels normally found on the Norwegian coast. NIFES found also that whelk accumulate cadmium more than do mussel.
