= USS Saturn (AK-49) =

Cargo ship of the United States Navy

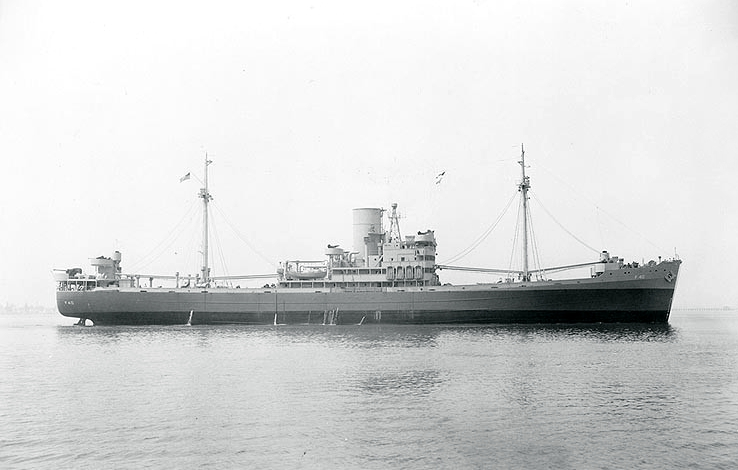
- USS Saturn (AF-40) in 1944

History

Nazi Germany
- Name: ES Arauca
- Namesake: Arauca, Colombia
- Owner: Hamburg America Line
- Operator: Hamburg America Line
- Port of registry: (Nazi Germany) Hamburg
- Builder: Bremer Vulkan
- Launched: 1939
- Completed: 1939
- Maiden voyage: August 1939
- Out of service: 19 December 1939
- Captured: 28 July 1941
- Fate: Interned in the United States; later requisitioned by the Navy, 20 April 1942

United States
- Name: SS Sting (1941); USS Saturn (1942–46); SS Saturn (1946–72)
- Operator: South Atlantic Steamship Company (1941); United States Navy (1942–46)
- Acquired: 20 April 1942
- Commissioned: 20 April 1942
- Decommissioned: 23 July 1946
- Stricken: 15 August 1946
- Identification: Call sign DKBG (1939)
- Fate: Sold for scrap, 12 September 1972

General characteristics
- Type: Cargo ship (1939–1941); Stores ship (1942–1972)
- Tonnage: 4,354 GRT; 2,079 NRT
- Displacement: 5,088 tons light; 9,760 maximum load
- Length: 398.3 ft (121.4 m) p/p; 423 ft (129 m) o/a
- Beam: 55.7 ft (17.0 m)
- Draught: 24 ft (7.3 m)
- Depth: 22.8 ft (6.9 m)
- Installed power: 5,600 shp
- Propulsion: turbo-electric transmission
- Speed: 17.5 knots (32.4 km/h)
- Complement: 180 (1944)
- Sensors & processing systems: direction finding; echo sounding
- Armament: As USS Saturn: 1942: 1 × 5"/51 caliber gun; 2 × 3"/50 caliber guns; 4 × 20mm guns; 1943: 1 × 5"/38 caliber gun; 2 × 3"/50 caliber guns; 8 × 20mm guns; 1944: 1 × 5"/38 caliber gun; 2 × 3"/50 caliber guns; 2 × Bofors 40mm autocannon; 4 × 20mm guns
- Notes: sister ships: Antilla, Orizaba

USS Saturn (AK-49) was a German cargo ship, built in 1939 as ES Arauca. ("ES" stands for "Electroschiff", meaning German: electric ship.) In 1941 before the US entered World War II, US authorities seized her and started converting her into a United States Navy stores ship. She was the sole ship of the US Navy's Saturn class. She was laid up in 1946 and scrapped in 1972.

Arauca was built for trade between Germany and the Caribbean, and was named accordingly. Arauca is a border town in eastern Colombia on the frontier with Venezuela.

== ES Arauca ==
Arauca was one of three sister ships that Bremer Vulkan of Bremen-Vegesack, Germany built in 1939 for Hamburg Amerikanische Paketfahrt AG (HAPAG). Arauca had two oil-fired high pressure LaMont boilers and turbo-electric transmission. Her boilers fed two AEG turbo generators, which fed current to an AEG electric propulsion motor on her single propeller shaft.

In August 1939 Arauca left Germany on her maiden voyage, carrying general cargo to Mexico. Technological problems dogged the voyage, including the superheater of one of her boilers being burnt out.

By the time she had reached port in Vera Cruz and completed discharging her cargo it was the beginning of September and Germany had invaded Poland. German merchant ships now risked being seized or sunk by the Royal Navy, so Arauca remained in port for the next two and a half months.

In December Arauca tried to make for Germany, but off the coast of Florida the light cruiser HMS Orion fired across her bow, so on 19 December she put into Port Everglades. Orion had opened fire in US territorial waters, which prompted a US protest to the UK Foreign Office.

== SS Sting ==
On 6 July 1941 US Presidential Executive Order 101 authorised the United States Maritime Commission to take over foreign ships lying idle in US ports. On 28 July 1941 the Commission took over Arauca and contracted her management to the South Atlantic Steamship Company of Savannah, Georgia, which renamed her SS Sting.

Sting had been idle in port for 19 months so on 19 August was towed from Port Everglades to the Alabama Drydock and Shipbuilding Company shipyard at Mobile, Alabama for repairs. There both the Maritime Commission and the South Atlantic SS Co concluded that they did not have engine-room crews skilled enough to run her transmission and high-pressure boilers, so on 14 November they offered her to the US Navy Auxiliary Vessels Board. On 2 December South Atlantic SS Co handed Sting back to the Commission, which continued to manage her repairs.

== USS Saturn ==
On 6 December 1941, the day before the Attack on Pearl Harbor, the Bureau of Navigation recommended that Sting be renamed Saturn. Her conversion for Navy use was meant to be completed by late December, but because of her technical complexity this was extended by several months. The opportunity was therefore taken to convert her more fully to Navy specifications, including armament, but the Maritime Commission retained sole charge of her repairs.

On 20 April 1942 Sting was delivered to the US Navy, commissioned as USS Saturn and classified AK-49 at Mobile, Alabama. On 3 May her Navy crew tried to take her to Charleston, South Carolina were stopped by the failure of her condensate pump, steering gear, anchor windlass, make up and main feed pumps, evaporators, fuel oil service pumps and turbine-driven exciter. She eventually left Mobile on 3 June but took until 14 June to reach Charleston, where she needed further repairs.

On 11 August 1942 Saturn tried to leave Charleston for Norfolk, Virginia but the water circulating pumps for both of her boilers failed. On 19 September she left Boston on the first of three trips supplying American bases in Newfoundland with general cargo. However, in October she was drydocked in Boston for emergency replacement of her stern tube, which took until December.

From March 1943 Saturn operated between east coast ports, mainly Norfolk, Virginia, and Baltimore, Maryland, and bases in the Caribbean such as Guantanamo and Trinidad. She suffered a loss of boiler feedwater and high oxygen content in her boiler water, so in July 1943 the Bureau of Ships gave the Norfolk Naval Shipyard plans to replace much of her boiler, feed and condensate system. There are no known records of whether this work was done, and nor are there records of any further technical problems.

In October and November 1943 Saturn made one transatlantic crossing to England, and then resumed supply trips between the US and Caribbean until September 1944. In April 1944 Norfolk Navy Yard converted her to a provision store ship and on 10 April she was reclassified AF-40. While in the Norfolk Navy Yard on April 27, 1944, a fire broke out in the hold, resulting in the death of 16 men working on the ship. This accident remained classified until 2010. On 2 September 1944 Saturn sailed to the Mediterranean carrying supplies for Operation Dragoon, the invasion of southern France. After one trip to Iceland and several voyages to the Caribbean, she made another trip to Oran, French Algeria in March 1945. Saturn resumed her supply voyages up and down the Atlantic Coast until arriving at Norfolk, Virginia on 1 July 1946.

=== Military awards and honors ===
Saturn received one battle star for her World War II service. Her crew was eligible for the following medals:

- American Campaign Medal
- Europe, Africa, Middle East Campaign Medal (1)
- World War II Victory Medal

== Decommissioning, layup and disposal ==
Saturn was decommissioned on 23 July 1946, redelivered to the War Shipping Administration on 25 July and struck from the Navy List on 15 August. She was laid up in the National Defense Reserve Fleet in the James River, Virginia until 12 September 1972, when she was sold to Isaac Varela of Castellón de la Plana, Spain for scrap.
