= SS Antilla (1939) =

Hamburg America Line cargo ship scuttled in 1940 off Aruba

Coordinates: 12°36′07″N 70°03′29″W

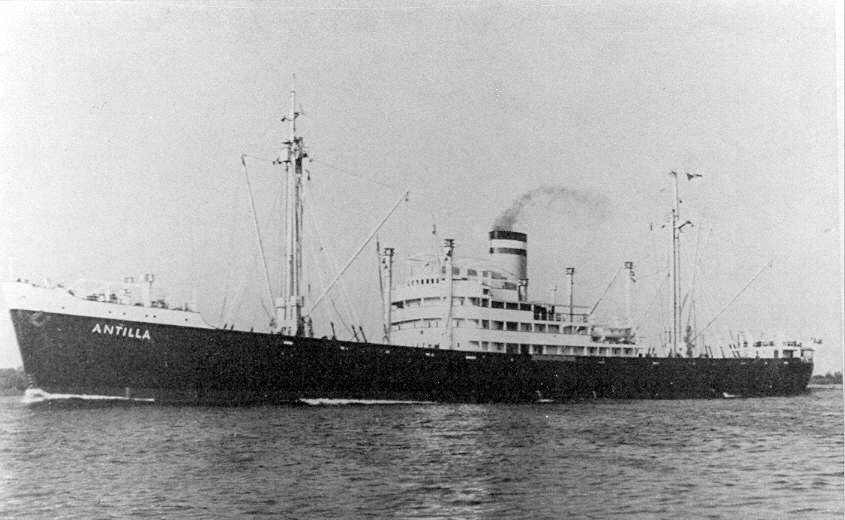
- Antilla in 1939

History

Nazi Germany
- Name: ES Antilla
- Namesake: Antilla, Cuba
- Owner: Hamburg America Line
- Operator: Hamburg America Line
- Port of registry: (Nazi Germany) Hamburg
- Builder: Deutsche Werft, Hamburg
- Yard number: 222
- Launched: 21 March 1939
- Completed: 11 July 1939
- Maiden voyage: 15 July 1939
- Out of service: 10 May 1940
- Identification: Call sign DKBA
- Fate: Scuttled, 10 May 1940

General characteristics
- Type: cargo ship
- Tonnage: 4,363 GRT; 2,164 NRT
- Length: 398.3 ft (121.4 m)
- Beam: 55.7 ft (17.0 m)
- Depth: 22.8 ft (6.9 m)
- Propulsion: turbo-electric transmission; single screw
- Speed: 15 knots (28 km/h)
- Crew: 35
- Sensors & processing systems: direction finding; echo sounding
- Notes: sister ships: Arauca, Orizaba

SS Antilla (or "ES Antilla", with "ES" standing for "Elektroschiff" German: electric ship) was a Hamburg America Line (HAPAG) cargo ship that was launched in 1939 and scuttled in 1940.

Antilla was built for trade between Germany and the Caribbean, and was named accordingly; Antilla is a city in Holguín Province in eastern Cuba.

== Building ==
Antilla was launched in Hamburg on 21 March 1939 and completed on 11 July. She was one of three sister ships launched in 1939 for HAPAG. She and her sister Orizaba were built by Deutsche Werft in Finkenwerder, Hamburg, while their sister Arauca was built by Bremer Vulkan in Bremen-Vegesack.

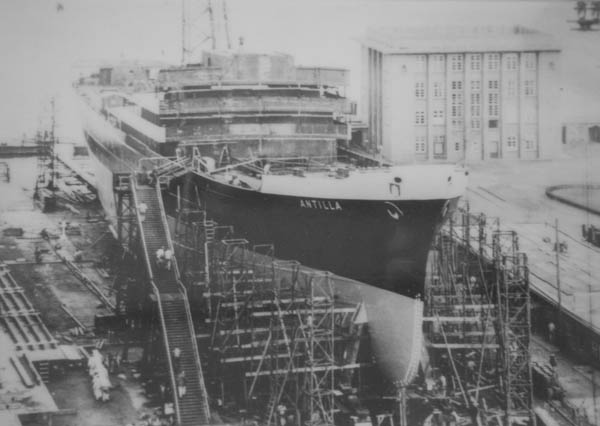
Antilla at shipyard

Antilla and her sisters had turbo-electric transmission. Each ship had two oil-fired high-pressure boilers that fed twin AEG turbo generators. This produced current for an AEG electric propulsion motor that drove a single propeller shaft.

== Maiden voyage ==
On 15 July 1939 Antilla left Hamburg on her maiden voyage, which took her to the Caribbean. The voyage was hampered by technical problems with her propulsion system, but she eventually reached Curaçao in the Netherlands Antilles.

On 9 August Antilla left Curaçao for Galveston, Texas, where she loaded 3,000 tons of sulphur for Europe. On 25 August, while still in Galveston, she received a radio message from Germany that included the code word "Essberger", which was a signal for her captain, Captain Ferdinand Schmidt, to open sealed orders. The sealed orders had been issued to all German merchant ships, and directed them to leave main shipping lanes. Shortly afterwards Antilla received a second radio message with the same code word. According to the sealed orders this was an order for captains to alter their ships' names and appearance, communicate only in code and return to Germany as soon as possible.

== Flight and refuge ==
Antilla left Galveston to bunker at Cartagena, Colombia. En route on 28 August she received a coded radio message that all German ships unable to reach a German harbour within four days should seek refuge in neutral ports. On 1 September, the day Germany invaded Poland, Antilla bunkered at Cartagena and sailed for neutral Curaçao. However, en route Schmidt learnt that Willemstad Harbour was already full of German merchant ships, so he and three other German ships changed course for Aruba. In October Antilla discharged her cargo of sulphur at San Nicolaas in the south of Aruba. However, the four ships' anchorage was in Malmok Bay in the northwest of the island.

The Royal Netherlands Navy submarine HNLMS O 14 monitored the German ships in Dutch Antilles waters. Outside Dutch Antilles waters, ships of the Royal Navy America and West Indies Station and of the French Navy patrolled, blockading any German ships from leaving. However, on 9 January 1940 ten members of Antilla's crew signed on to one of the other German ships, HC Horn's Consul Horn, which that evening successfully escaped through the Allied blockade. On 29 February the other two ships, Rudolf Christian Gribel's Heidelberg and HAPAG's Troja tried to escape. Royal Navy ships intercepted them so their crews scuttled the two merchantmen to prevent their capture.

== Scuttling ==
Position of Antilla's wreck off Aruba

On 9 April Germany invaded Denmark and Norway. This increased the fear that the Netherlands would also be invaded, so on 12 April Dutch authorities in Aruba confined Antilla's crew to their ship. On 10 May Germany invaded the Netherlands so the Dutch government ordered the seizure of all German ships in the Dutch Antilles. At 0310 hrs on 10 May a section of Dutch Marines in two boats approached Antilla to board her but Schmidt refused to lower the gangway. The Dutch marines were commanded by a captain who anticipated armed resistance from the German crew. He therefore postponed the boarding to first light, when a machine gun positioned ashore could provide cover.

The German crew used the delay to start scuttling Antilla. One crewman locked himself in the engine room, opened her seacocks and climbed out through the funnel. Other crew set fire to several parts of the ship. At 05:00 the Dutch marines boarded the ship and at 05:30 the German crew was assembled on the poop deck. The Marines escorted the crew ashore in a lifeboat and handed them into the custody of the Royal Marechaussee.

At 06:00, two Netherlands Coastguard vessels, HM Aruba and HM Practico, reached Malmok Bay and found Antilla on fire. Two of Aruba's crew boarded Antilla, found the engine room and holds 4 and 5 ablaze, and that it was not possible to reach the seacocks in order to close them. After the Dutch marines had removed the German crew, Aruba fired two rounds at Antilla from her 37mm gun. By 06:50, Antilla was afire from bow to stern and she was listing 20 degrees to port. Aruba left Malmok Bay at 11:30, by which time Antilla's list had increased to 30 degrees and she was sinking.

== Internment ==
The Dutch Antilles authorities interned as enemy aliens 220 German nationals, including Antilla's 35 crew. The Dutch made Antilla's crew build an internment camp on Bonaire to house their fellow detainees. However, the British authorities had agreed to take them and intern them on Jamaica. On 5 July 1940 all 220 detainees were embarked on the British banana boat Jamaica Producer. It took them to Jamaica, where they were interned for the rest of the war.

== Wreck ==
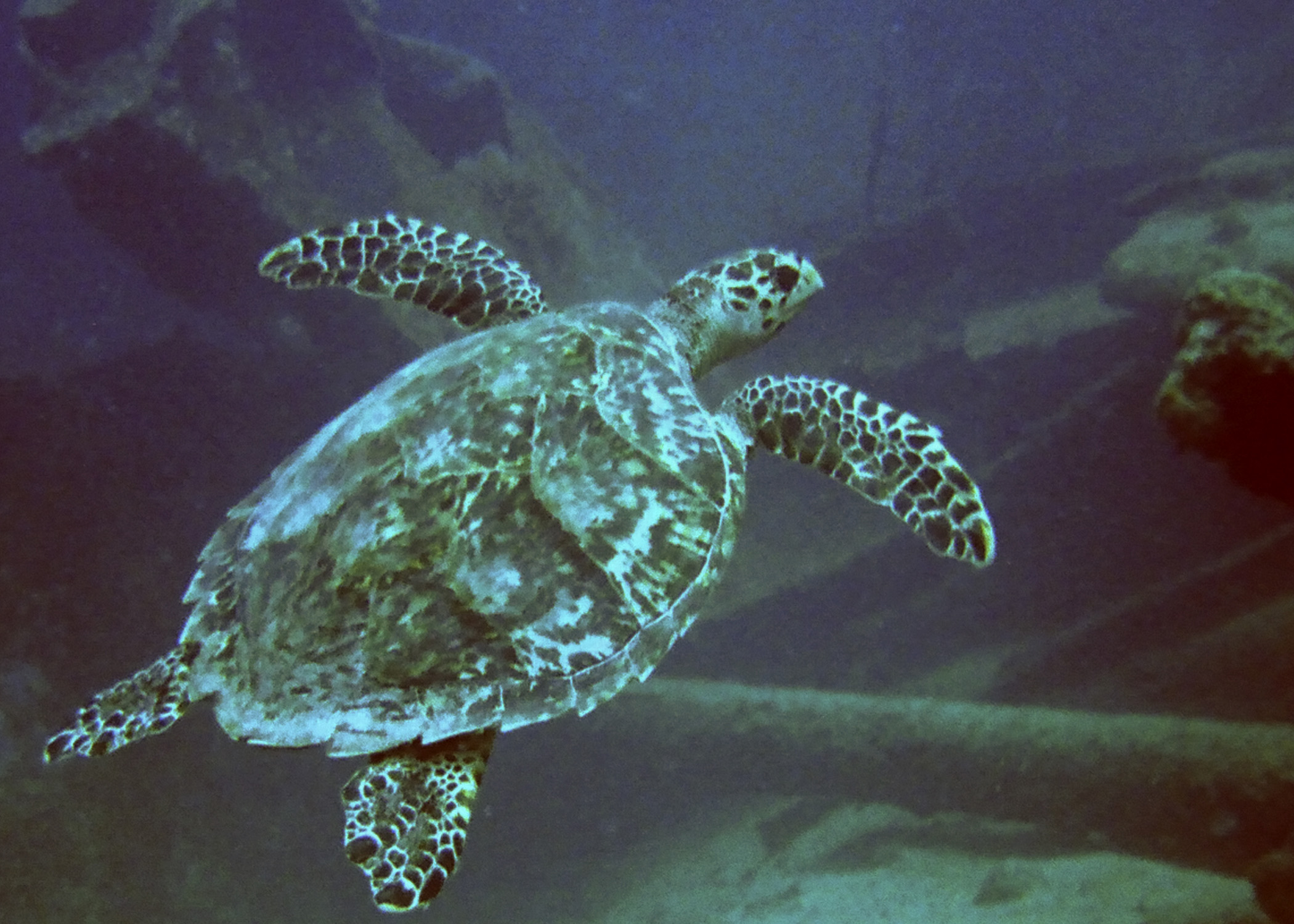
Hawksbill sea turtle swimming by Antilla's wreck

Antilla is one of the Caribbean's largest shipwrecks, exceeded by only the 600-foot (180 m) cruise liners Bianca C. and Antilles. Antilla lies on its port side in Malmok Bay, Aruba in up to 60 feet (18 m) of water. By 1953 storm damage had broken the wreck in two amidships.

Corals and tube sponges have colonised the wreck, which attracts lobsters, hawksbill sea turtles and many species of fish, including moray eels and blue tang. In 2010 a large Atlantic goliath grouper was reported living in the forward section.

Antilla is a popular dive site, and has been popular for penetration diving. Storm damage has continued to break up the wreck, and some divers consider it now unsafe to enter.

== Misconceptions ==
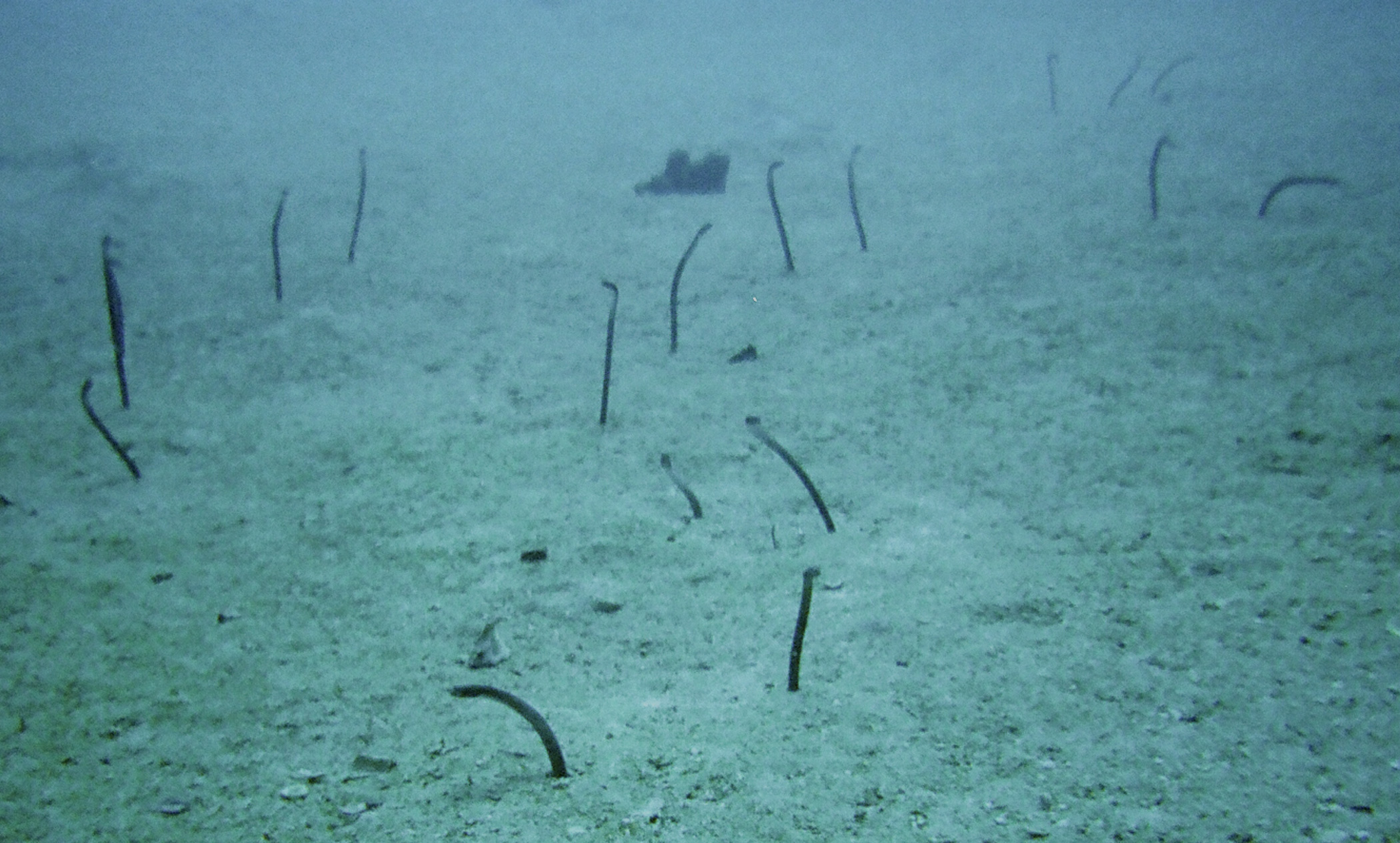
Garden eels by Antilla's wreck

Popular misconceptions have arisen around Antilla. One is that she was secretly a U-boat tender. In fact between her arrival off Aruba in September 1939 and Germany's invasion of the Netherlands in May 1940 the Dutch authorities repeatedly searched Antilla for weapons and found none. One source even claims Antilla was a tender for Operation Neuland, even though this operation was in February and March 1942, 21 months after Antilla was scuttled.

A second misconception is that when the Dutch sought to take over the ship, Captain Schmidt negotiated a 24-hour delay. In fact the delay between the Dutch marines reaching Antilla and boarding her was less than two hours. This was achieved not by negotiation but by Schmidt refusing to lower the gangway and the marines' captain deciding to wait for daybreak.

A third misconception is that when scuttling the ship, the crew heated her boilers so that the seawater entering through her seacocks caused a boiler explosion, and that this explosion broke the ship in half. In fact between May and August 1940 Dutch divers found that the wreck was intact. It was not until 1953 that it was found to have broken in half, and this was caused by storm damage.

A fourth misconception is that Captain Schmidt of the Antilla spent the war in a prison camp on Bonaire and after the war bought the camp to build the Divi Flamingo Hotel. In fact the entire crew was transported to Jamaica and after the war the camp was bought by local entrepreneur Lodewijk Gerharts who built the hotel, initially named "Hotel Zeebad".
