= Bill Anttila =

William K. Anttila (February 25, 1919 – February 2, 2011) was a long-time American water polo coach, and member of the USA Water Polo Hall of Fame. When he retired in 1984 after 38 years of coaching, he was the winningest (759 wins in 1059 contests) water polo coach in the United States.

== Biography ==
Anttila was born in 1919 to parents from Finland. He died in 2011 in Stockton, California.

== Career ==
Anttila coached water polo for 38 years with colleges in California. He coached swimming and water polo at Stockton College from 1946 to 1984. In 1947, he started the water polo program at the University of the Pacific. Between 1963 and 1983, he coached the San Joaquin Delta College water polo team. He retired from coaching in 1984.

== Personal life ==
Anttila served as a pilot in the US Navy during World War II He was married for 61 years to his wife Sisko; they had three children.

== Honors and awards ==
Anttila was Northern California Coach of the Year in 1975, and Coach of the Year by the California Coaches Association in 1978. He was inducted into the University of the Pacific Athletic Hall of Fame in 1989, and to the USA Water Polo Hall of Fame in 2003.
