= Antilla, Salta =

Antilla
- Municipality and village
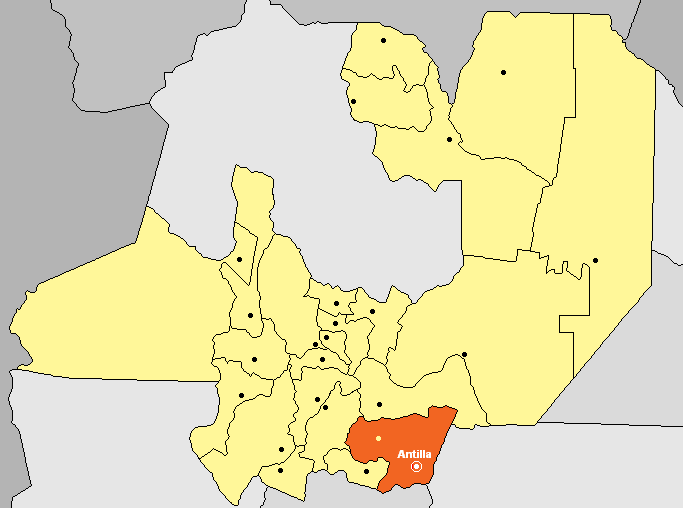
- Location in Salta Province

- Location in Argentina
- Coordinates: 26°07′10″S 64°35′37″W
- Country: Argentina
- Province: Salta
- Department: Rosario de la Frontera
- Elevation: 1,634 ft (498 m)

Population (2001)
  - Total: 619
- Time zone: UTC−3 (ART)
- Postal code: A4193
- Area code: 03786
- Climate: Cwa

Antilla is a village and rural municipality in Salta Province in northwestern Argentina. It is located southeast of the city of Rosario de la Frontera through National Route 34 at km 931.

== Population ==
Antilla had 619 inhabitants (INDEC, 2001), representing an increase of 20% compared with the 516 inhabitants (INDEC, 1991) of the previous census.
