= Consul Horn =

Three ships have borne the name Consul Horn, all owned, for at least part of their career, by the German Shipping Company HC Horn:

- 1901–1928, SS Consul Horn, a 2,514 GRT steam cargo ship built for HC Horn by Helsingör Jernskib & Maskinbyggeri. Seized by France during the First World War. Subsequently named Sampierdarena, Heinz Kayser, Lotte Leonhardt and Herrenwyk. Foundered in the Atlantic Ocean in 1928
- 1904−1942, SS Consul Horn, a 8,384 GRT steam cargo ship previously called Mamari, Gerolstein and Consul, sunk by a mine of the coast of the Netherlands
- 1924−1959 MS Consul Horn a 3,376 GRT diesel-powered cargo ship, later renamed Hindhead, Rio Negro and finally Morska Wola
