= Juho Erkki Antila =

Finnish politician

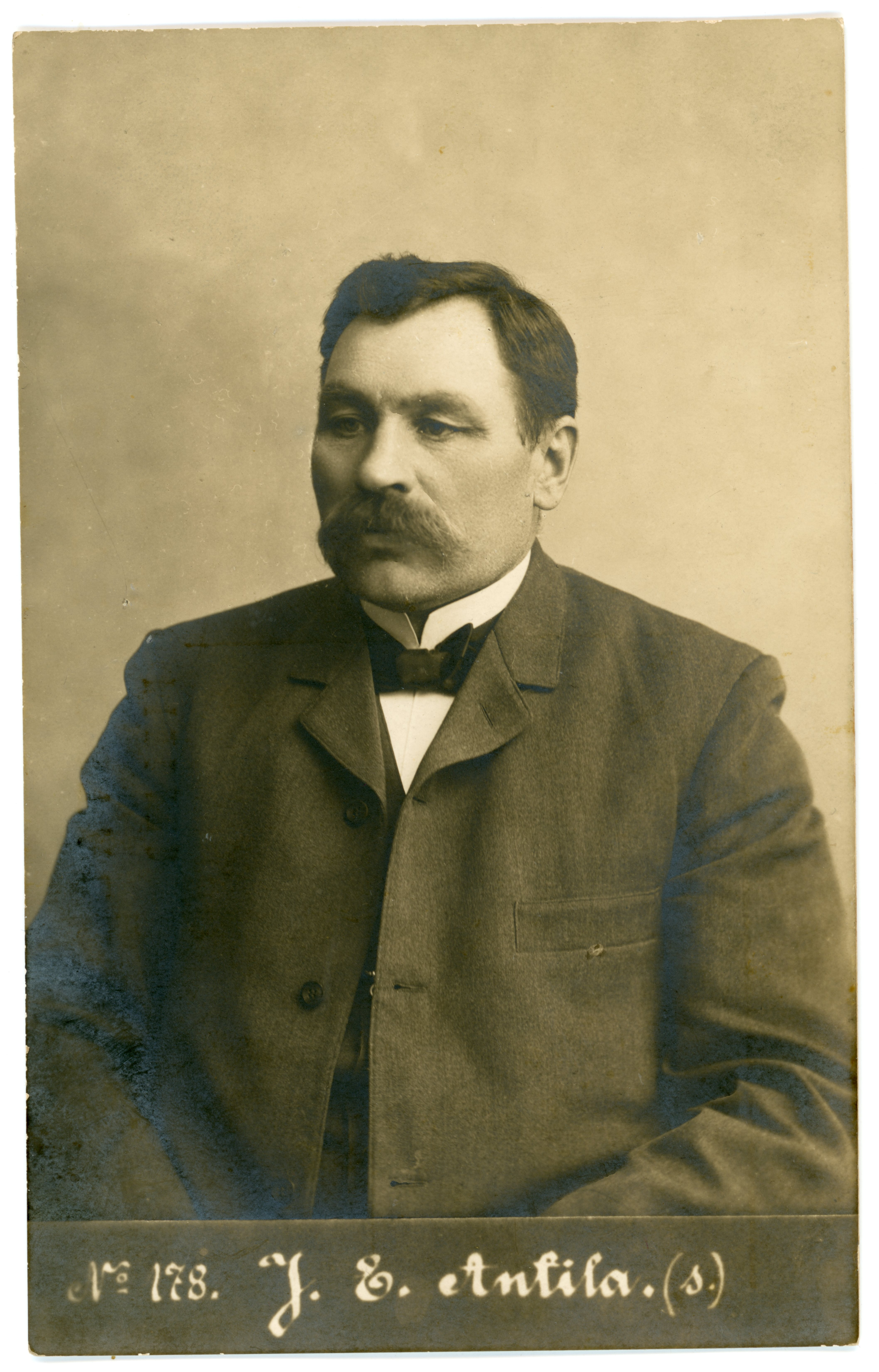
Juho Erkki Antila

Juho Erkki Antila (1 January 1856 in Kurikka – 10 March 1920) was a Finnish farmer and politician. He was a member of the Diet of Finland from 1905 to 1906 and of the Parliament of Finland from 1907 to 1910 and from 1916 to 1919. He represented the Finnish Party until 1918 and the National Coalition Party from 1918 to 1919.
