= Hämeen-Anttila =

Hämeen-Anttila is a Finnish-language surname. Notable people with the surname include:

- Jaakko Hämeen-Anttila (born 1963), Finnish academic researcher
- Virpi Hämeen-Anttila (born 1958), Finnish writer

== See also ==
- Anttila (surname)
