= John Antila =

American businessman and politician

John Antila (February 6, 1902 – July 2, 1969) was an American businessman and politician.

Antila was born in Duluth, Minnesota and he lived with his wife and family in Duluth. He was involved in the bakery and grocery businesses. Antila served in the Minnesota House of Representatives from 1937 to 1944.
