= Ulla Anttila =

Finnish politician (born 1963)

Ulla Mari Ainikki Anttila (born 13 December 1963 in Helsinki) is a Finnish politician and a former member of Finnish Parliament, representing the Green League. She was first elected to the parliament in 1991 and left the parliament 2007. She is also a member of the city council of Vantaa (1985–1996, 2005-).

In 2011 she became the acting Executive Director of KIOS (the Finnish NGO Foundation for Human Rights) and in 2013 she took the job on completely.

Anttila was born in Helsinki, Finland. She has a Master's degree in Social psychology from the University of Helsinki. She is married to Tero Taponen. They have two children, Alli (b. 1994) and Taru (b. 1997).
