= USS Antilla =

Cargo ship of the United States Navy

History

United States
- Name: USS Antilla
- Namesake: Antilla, a town in Cuba (previous name retained)
- Builder: William Gray & Company, West Hartlepool, England
- Launched: 19 November 1903
- Completed: 1904
- Acquired: 14 May 1918
- Commissioned: 20 May 1918
- Decommissioned: 20 February 1919
- Fate: Returned to owner
- Notes: In commercial service as SS Antilla 1904-1918 and from 1919

General characteristics
- Type: Cargo ship
- Displacement: 3,668 long tons (3,727 t)
- Length: 358 ft (109 m)
- Beam: 45 ft (14 m)
- Propulsion: Steam engine
- Speed: 10 kn (12 mph; 19 km/h)
- Complement: 52

USS Antilla was a United States Navy cargo ship in commission from 1918 to 1919.

SS Antilla was built as a commercial cargo ship at West Hartlepool, England, by William Gray & Company. The U.S. Navy acquired her for World War I service from the New York and Cuba Mail Steamship Company on 14 May 1918 and commissioned her on 20 May 1918 at Hoboken, New Jersey as USS Antilla.

Attached to the Naval Overseas Transportation Service, Antilla made two voyages to Europe while in commission, but spent much of the rest of her time in commission undergoing repairs. She was decommissioned on 20 February 1919 and returned to the New York and Cuba Mail Steamship Company.

Unlike most commercial ships commissioned into U.S. Navy service during World War I, Antilla never received a naval registry Identification Number (Id. No.).
