= Susan Antilla =

Freelance journalist

Susan Antilla is a financial journalist and author.

== Career ==
Antilla has written for The New York Times, Bloomberg, The Nation, The American Prospect, The Intercept, New York, CNBC and CNN, among others. She was New York bureau chief of the Money Section of USA Today.

More recently she engaged in journalism projects for Type Investigations, the investigative newsroom of Type Media Center.

Antilla is the author of Tales From the Boom-Boom Room: The Landmark Legal Battles That Exposed Wall Street’s Shocking Culture of Sexual Harassment (2002), an exploration of sexual harassment on Wall Street in the 1990s, focusing especially upon Smith Barney. The New York Observer called the book “a work of compelling Wall Street anthropology.”

Antilla has received awards from The Silurians Press Club and the Society for Advancing Business Editing and Writing (SABEW). She received the 2016 journalism award for consumer reporting from the New York Press Club. The Connecticut Press Club selected Tales From The Boom-Boom Room for “Best Book of the Year” in 2002. The book was the National Federation of Press Women 2003 winner in the non-fiction book category.

She received the “Excellence in Financial Journalism” award from the New York State Society of Certified Public Accountants in 1996, and the “Women’s Leadership Award” from Manhattanville College. She has twice been a finalist for the prestigious Gerald Loeb awards for financial journalism, in 1997 and 1998.

=== False-light lawsuit ===
In 1994, Antilla wrote an article for the New York Times that repeated rumors spread by short-sellers suggesting Presstek Inc. chief executive officer Robert Howard was really a convicted felon named Howard Finkelstein. In an editors' note the next day, the Times said that there was no credible evidence to support the rumor and expressed regret for printing it. Howard sued in 1997, accusing Antilla of defamation and casting him in a false light. The Times was not sued by Howard. The jury ruled in Howard's favor on the false light issue, but denied the defamation claim.

In 2000 Antilla was ordered to pay damages of $480,000 to Howard. The court judgment was reversed by a federal appeals court in 2002. The judges wrote that “only a strained reading of the article” would result in a conclusion that Antilla had accused Howard of being Finkelstein.
