= Heinrich Schroeteler =

WWII German submarine commander (1915–2000)

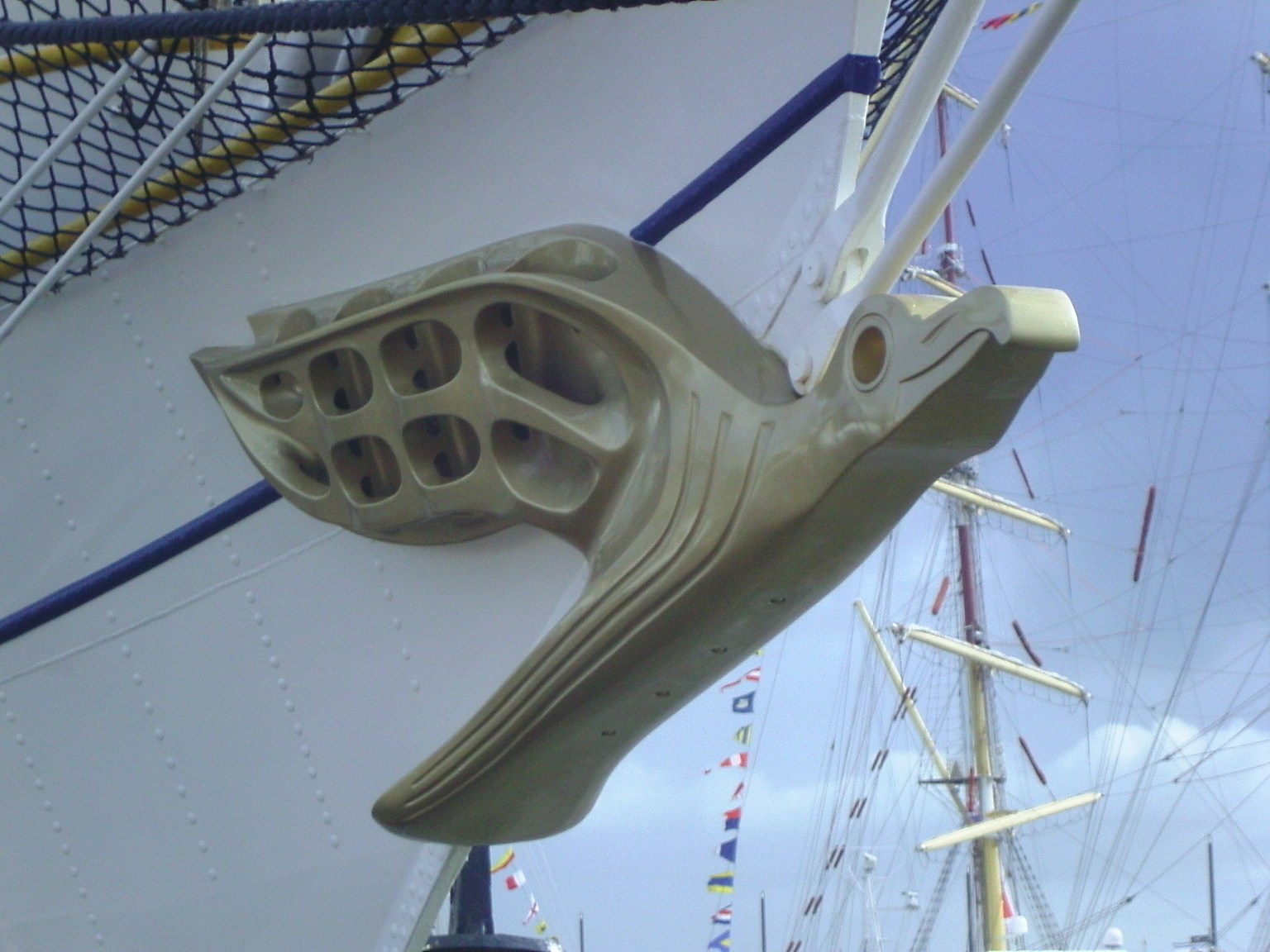
- SSS Gorch Fock
- Born: 10 December 1915; Essen-Katernberg
- Died: 19 January 2000 (aged 84); Bochum
- Education: Ruhr University
- Notable work: SSS Gorch Fock; Kortum-monument
- Awards: Ruhr-Universität Medal
- Military career
- Allegiance: Nazi Germany
- Branch: Kriegsmarine
- Service years: 1936–45
- Rank: Oberleutnant zur See
- Units: Schlesien; Panzerschiff Admiral Scheer; U-96
- Commands: U-667; U-1023
- Conflicts: World War II: Battle of the Atlantic; Actions of 7/8 May 1945; Operation Deadlight
- Awards: Knight's Cross of the Iron Cross

Dr. Heinrich Andreas Schroeteler (10 December 1915 – 19 January 2000) was a German sculptor. During World War II, he commanded U-boat and received the Knight's Cross of the Iron Cross (German: Ritterkreuz des Eisernen Kreuzes); during the post-war years, he pursued a career in art history and archeology.

== Family ==
Schroeteler was born in Essen in 1915, one of eleven children. He followed his family's tradition of marine service in 1936.

== Military career ==
Schroeteler was credited with damaging one merchant ship, the British steam merchant Riverton, of 7,345 gross register tons (GRT), and sinking one warship, the Norwegian minesweeper HNoMS NYMS-382, of 335 GRT. The sinking took place on 7 May 1945, three days after the U-boats had been ordered to surrender. Schroeteler had been transferred to the U-boat service in September 1941 and went on patrol from 23 April 1942 to 15 July 1942 on U-96 as a Kommandantenschüler (commander-in-training) under the command of Hans-Jürgen Hellriegel. He spent three years as a prisoner of war in England before returning to Germany in 1948.

== Artist ==
Following the war, Schroeteler worked as a freelance painter in Bochum. At the age of 50 years, he took up the study of art history, archeology and medieval history at the Ruhr University Bochum. After graduating in 1969 he worked as a research associate at the Institute of Archaeology. He headed up the modeling workshop, and was curator of collections. His success in reconstructing ancient works of art was honored with the University Medal from the Ruhr University in 1981. Under the leadership of Bernard Andreae, Schroeteler worked along with Silvano Bertolin on the cast reconstruction of "The Blinding of Polyphemus".

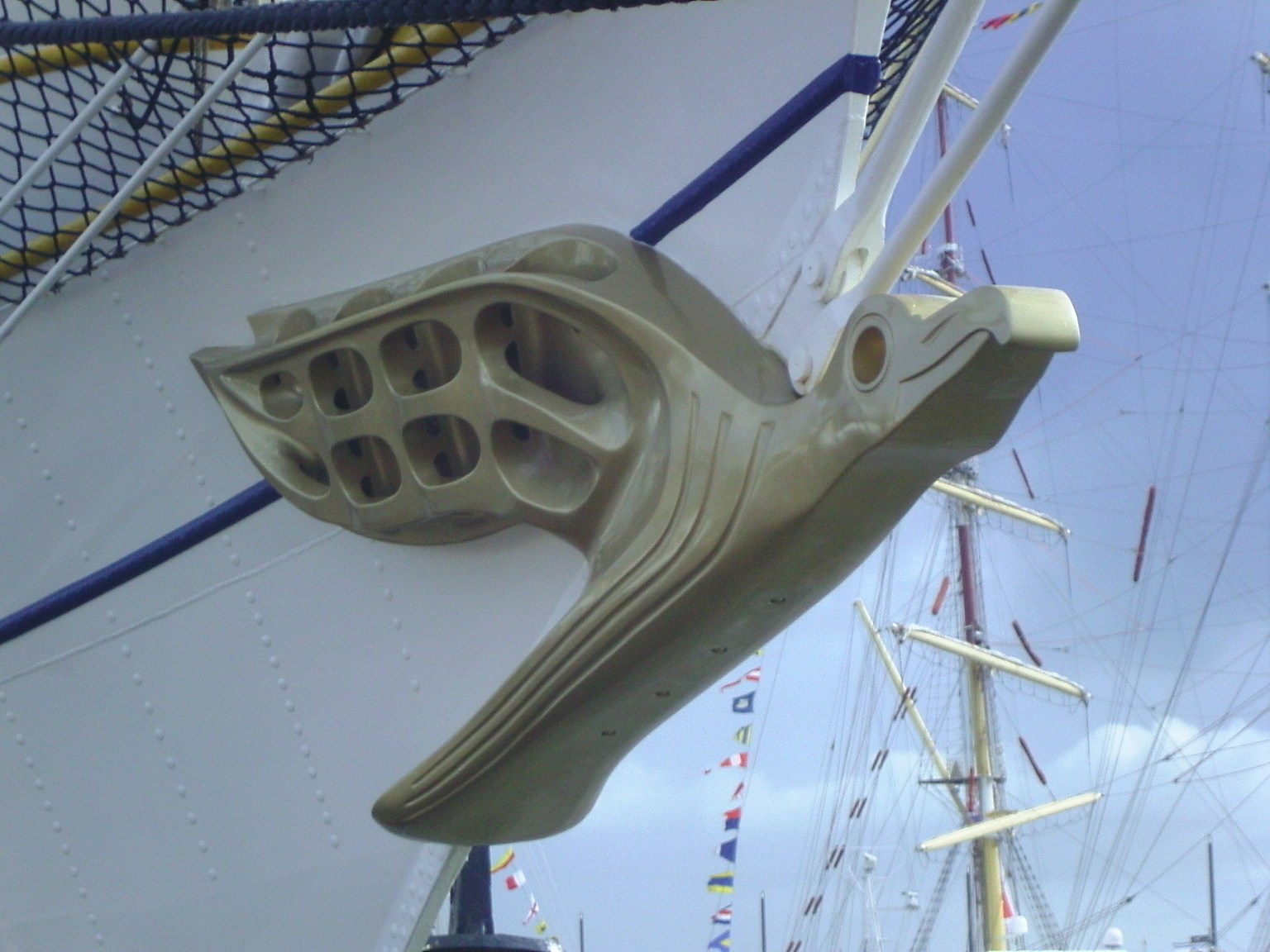
Schroeteler designed the original figurehead of the SSS Gorch Fock.

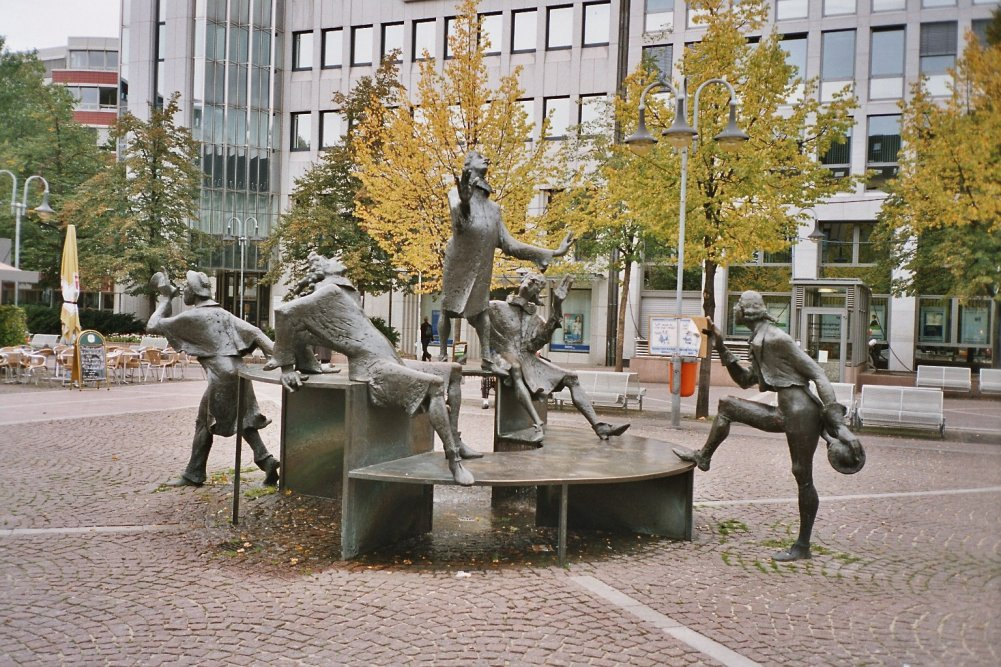
Kortum-monument ("Jobsiade") by Heinrich Schroeteler

== Political views ==
The historian Hans H. Hanke summarized Schroeteler's biography in a memorandum written for Bochum's Committee on Culture and Sport (Ausschuss für Kultur und Sport) dated 5 February 2014. According to Hanke, Schroeteler remained an agitator for National Socialism his entire life. Hanke based this statement on the fact that Schroeteler had hosted numerous meetings of former German U-boat and British submarine crews in his workshop under the German war ensign, the Reichskriegsflagge. In addition, Schroeteler supported the political views of the Neo-Nazis, in particular where these views matched his ambitions "to do justice to the deeds of the Wehrmacht in the service of its country" ("den Verdiensten der Wehrmacht um das Vaterland gerecht zu werden") and to "restore the Wehrmacht’s honour abroad" ("um die Ehre der deutschen Wehrmacht im Ausland wiederherzustellen").

Schroeteler also attended Großadmiral (grand admiral) Karl Dönitz's funeral. Dönitz was the former Commander-in-Chief of the Kriegsmarine, Adolf Hitler's successor as the head of state of Nazi Germany and convicted war criminal at the Nuremberg trials. There, Schroeteler was one of the six pallbearers who carried Dönitz to his grave, all six wearing their wartime Knight's Crosses.

Finally, Schroeteler allowed himself to be photographed wearing his uniform and Knight's Cross and sent signature postcards to interested people. He also supported publications that glamorized the war. Hanke stated that he had no sympathy for Schroeteler's ambitions to rehabilitate the Wehrmacht by fostering the myth of the clean Wehrmacht. Hanke believed that Schroeteler should have used his position as an academic and artist to distance himself from the political right.

== Military awards ==
- Iron Cross (1939)
  - 2nd Class (24 October 1940)
  - 1st Class (14 April 1941)
- Minesweeper War Badge (14 November 1940)
- U-boat War Badge (1939) (6 July 1942)
- U-boat Front Clasp (7 October 1944)
- German Cross in Gold on 10 November 1944 as Kapitänleutnant on U-667 in the 7th U-boat Flotilla
- Knight's Cross of the Iron Cross on 2 May 1945 as Kapitänleutnant and commander of U-1023
