= German submarine U-667 =

German World War II submarine

History

Nazi Germany
- Name: U-667
- Ordered: 15 August 1940
- Builder: Deutsche Werft, Hamburg
- Yard number: 816
- Laid down: 16 August 1941
- Launched: 29 August 1942
- Commissioned: 21 October 1942
- Fate: Sunk on 26 August 1944

General characteristics
- Class & type: Type VIIC submarine
- Displacement: 769 tonnes (757 long tons) surfaced; 871 t (857 long tons) submerged
- Length: 67.10 m (220 ft 2 in) o/a; 50.50 m (165 ft 8 in) pressure hull
- Beam: 6.20 m (20 ft 4 in) o/a; 4.70 m (15 ft 5 in) pressure hull
- Height: 9.60 m (31 ft 6 in)
- Draught: 4.74 m (15 ft 7 in)
- Installed power: 2,800–3,200 PS (2,100–2,400 kW; 2,800–3,200 bhp) (diesels); 750 PS (550 kW; 740 shp) (electric)
- Propulsion: 2 shafts; 2 × diesel engines; 2 × electric motors
- Speed: 17.7 knots (32.8 km/h; 20.4 mph) surfaced; 7.6 knots (14.1 km/h; 8.7 mph) submerged
- Range: 8,500 nmi (15,700 km; 9,800 mi) at 10 knots (19 km/h; 12 mph) surfaced; 80 nmi (150 km; 92 mi) at 4 knots (7.4 km/h; 4.6 mph) submerged
- Test depth: 230 m (750 ft); Crush depth: 250–295 m (820–968 ft)
- Complement: 4 officers, 40–56 enlisted
- Armament: 5 × 53.3 cm (21 in) torpedo tubes (four bow, one stern); 14 × torpedoes; 1 × 8.8 cm (3.46 in) deck gun (220 rounds); 2 × twin 2 cm (0.79 in) C/30 anti-aircraft guns

Service record
- Part of: 5th U-boat Flotilla; 21 October 1942 – 31 May 1943; 7th U-boat Flotilla; 1 June 1943 – 26 August 1944
- Identification codes: M 50 568
- Commanders: Oblt.z.S. / Kptlt. Heinrich Schroeteler; 21 October 1942 – May 1944; Kptlt. Karl-Heinz Lange; 10 July 1944 – 26 August 1944
- Operations: 5 patrols: 1st patrol: 20 May – 26 July 1943; 2nd patrol: a. 14 – 16 September 1943; b. 18 September – 11 October 1943; 3rd patrol: 18 November 1943 – 6 January 1944; 4th patrol: 8 March – 19 May 1944; 5th patrol: 22 July – 26 August 1944
- Victories: 1 merchant ship sunk (7,176 GRT); 2 warships sunk (1,171 tons); 1 warship total loss (1,653 tons)

German submarine U-667 was a Type VIIC U-boat built for Nazi Germany's Kriegsmarine for service during World War II. She was laid down on 16 August 1941 by Deutsche Werft, Hamburg as yard number 816, launched on 29 August 1942 and commissioned on 21 October 1942 under Oberleutnant zur See Heinrich Schroeteler.

== Design ==
German Type VIIC submarines were preceded by the shorter Type VIIB submarines. U-667 had a displacement of 769 tonnes (757 long tons) when at the surface and 871 tonnes (857 long tons) while submerged. She had a total length of 67.10 m (220 ft 2 in), a pressure hull length of 50.50 m (165 ft 8 in), a beam of 6.20 m (20 ft 4 in), a height of 9.60 m (31 ft 6 in), and a draught of 4.74 m (15 ft 7 in). The submarine was powered by two Germaniawerft F46 four-stroke, six-cylinder supercharged diesel engines producing a total of 2,800 to 3,200 metric horsepower (2,060 to 2,350 kW; 2,760 to 3,160 shp) for use while surfaced, two Siemens-Schuckert GU 343/38-8 double-acting electric motors producing a total of 750 metric horsepower (550 kW; 740 shp) for use while submerged. She had two shafts and two 1.23 m (4 ft) propellers. The boat was capable of operating at depths of up to 230 metres (750 ft).

The submarine had a maximum surface speed of 17.7 knots (32.8 km/h; 20.4 mph) and a maximum submerged speed of 7.6 knots (14.1 km/h; 8.7 mph). When submerged, the boat could operate for 80 nautical miles (150 km; 92 mi) at 4 knots (7.4 km/h; 4.6 mph); when surfaced, she could travel 8,500 nautical miles (15,700 km; 9,800 mi) at 10 knots (19 km/h; 12 mph). U-667 was fitted with five 53.3 cm (21 in) torpedo tubes (four fitted at the bow and one at the stern), fourteen torpedoes, one 8.8 cm (3.46 in) SK C/35 naval gun, 220 rounds, and two twin 2 cm (0.79 in) C/30 anti-aircraft guns. The boat had a complement of between forty-four and sixty.

== Service history ==
The boat's career began with training at 5th U-boat Flotilla on 21 October 1942, followed by active service on 1 June 1943 as part of the 7th Flotilla for the remainder of her service.

In five patrols she sank one merchant ship, for a total of 7,176 gross register tons (GRT) and 2 warships. She also cause one warship total loss.

=== Wolfpacks ===
U-667 took part in five wolfpacks, namely:

- Coronel (4 – 8 December 1943)
- Coronel 2 (8 – 14 December 1943)
- Coronel 3 (14 – 17 December 1943)
- Borkum (18 – 26 December 1943)
- Preussen (13 – 22 March 1944)

=== Fate ===
U-667 sunk on 26 August 1944 in the Bay of Biscay in position 46°6′N 01°36′W, when she struck a mine. All hands were lost.

== Summary of raiding history ==
Date	Ship Name	Nationality	Tonnage (Note: Merchant ship tonnages are in gross register tons. Military vessels are listed by tons displacement.)	Fate
8 August 1944	Ezra Weston	United States	7,176	Sunk
8 August 1944	HMCS Regina	Royal Canadian Navy	925	Sunk
14 August 1944	USS LST-921	United States Navy	1,653	Total loss
14 August 1944	HMS LCI(L)-99	Royal Navy	246	Sunk

== Bibliography ==
- Busch, Rainer; Röll, Hans-Joachim (1999). German U-boat commanders of World War II : a biographical dictionary. Translated by Brooks, Geoffrey. London, Annapolis, Md: Greenhill Books, Naval Institute Press. ISBN 1-55750-186-6.
- Busch, Rainer; Röll, Hans-Joachim (1999). Der U-Boot-Krieg, 1939-1945: Deutsche U-Boot-Verluste von September 1939 bis Mai 1945 [German U-boat losses from September 1939 to May 1945] (in German). Vol. IV. Hamburg, Berlin, Bonn: Mittler. ISBN 3-8132-0514-2.
- Gröner, Eric; Jung, Dieter; Maass, Martin (1991). German Warships 1815-1945: U-boats and Mine Warfare Vessels. Vol. 2. Translated by Thomas, Keith; Magowan, Rachel. London: Conway Maritime Press. ISBN 0-85177-593-4.
- Sharpe, Peter (1998). U-Boat Fact File. Great Britain: Midland Publishing. ISBN 1-85780-072-9.
