= SS Avondale Park =

Canadian merchant ship sunk in World War II

History

Canada
- Name: Avondale Park
- Owner: Canadian Government (1943); Ministry of War Transport (1944)
- Operator: Park Steamship Co Ltd (1943); Witherington & Everett (1944)
- Port of registry: (Canada) Montreal
- Builder: Pictou Shipyard, Foundation Maritime Ltd
- Launched: February 1944
- Completed: May 1944
- Identification: Code Letters VDDN; UK Official Number 175378
- Fate: Torpedoed and sunk 7 May 1945

General characteristics
- Tonnage: 2,878 GRT; 1,653 NRT
- Length: 315 ft 5 in (96.14 m)
- Beam: 46 ft 5 in (14.15 m)
- Depth: 22 ft 9 in (6.93 m)
- Installed power: Triple expansion steam engine
- Propulsion: Screw propeller
- Crew: 34, plus 4 DEMS gunners
- Armament: 1 x 4 inch deck gun aft; 1 x 3 inch (76 mm)/50 caliber gun; 4 x 20 mm Oerlikon; 2 x Twin .50 cal. nachine guns; 20 x Rail Anti-Aircraft Rocket Launcher (Pillar Box)

Avondale Park was a 2,872 GRT Canadian cargo ship which was built by Pictou Shipyard at Pictou, Nova Scotia in 1944. She was the last merchant ship to be sunk by Germany in the Second World War, on 7 May 1945, the day of the signing of the German surrender, and less than an hour before it went into effect. She was built as a merchant steamship constructed for Canada's Merchant Navy in 1944 as part of Canada's Park ship program.

== Description ==
The ship was built by Foundation Maritime Limited's Pictou Shipyard in Pictou, Nova Scotia. She was launched in February 1944, and completed in May 1944.

The ship was 315 feet 5 inches (96.14 m) long, with a beam of 46 feet 5 inches (14.15 m) and a depth of 22 feet 9 inches (6.93 m). She had a GRT of 2,878 and a NRT of 1,653.

She was propelled by a triple expansion steam engine which had cylinders 20 inches (51 cm), 31 inches (79 cm) and 55 inches (140 cm) diameter by 39 inches (99 cm) stroke. The engine was built by Canada Iron Foundries, Three Rivers, Quebec.

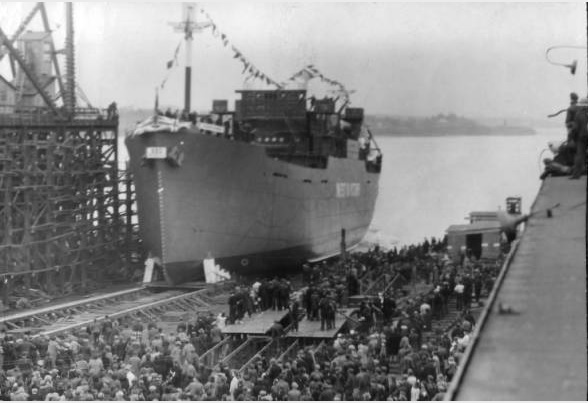
A Typical cargo Park ship. Launch of SS Ashby Park at the Pictou Shipyard in 1944

== History ==
Avondale Park was built for the Canadian Government and operated by the Park Steamship Co Ltd. The United Kingdom Official Number 175378 and code letters VDDN were allocated. Her port of registry was Montreal, under the British flag. She was later chartered by the Ministry of War Transport, who placed her under the management of Witherington & Etheridge, Newcastle upon Tyne.

Avondale Park was a member of Convoy EN 491, which departed Hull on 6 May 1945 bound for Belfast via Methil. On 7 May 1945, the convoy was attacked by U-2336 and two ships were sunk, Sneland I and Avondale Park, which became the last British merchant ship to be sunk during the Second World War. The sinking, at just after 23:00 on 7 May 1945, was in the last hours of the Second World War in Europe, with the official surrender taking place at 23:01 on 8 May 1945. Avondale Park sank at 56°05′N 02°32′W. Two of the 38 crew were lost. A signal had been sent to the U-boats on 4 May 1945 ordering them to surrender but U-2336 did not receive the signal.

== See also ==
- Actions of 7–8 May 1945
