= Actions of 7–8 May 1945 =

The last actions in British coastal waters and the last actions of the Battle of the Atlantic took place on 7–8 May 1945.

== Background ==
During the first five months of 1945, the U-boat Arm (UbW) of Nazi Germany's Kriegsmarine dispatched 125 U-boat patrols to the Atlantic, operating principally in British coastal waters. By 5 May 1945, just 29 were still at large.

== Actions ==
On the morning of 7 May 1945, U-320 — a modified Type VIIC/41 boat under O/L H Emmerich — was two days into her first operational patrol and running submerged, when she was detected by an RAF Catalina under Flt/Lt KM Murray of 210 Squadron, Coastal Command. Murray attacked immediately with a pattern of depth charges. U-320 was damaged but not destroyed; Murray sighted oil, and sonobuoys dropped by the Catalina detected hammering. Murray was unable to continue the attack and by mid-afternoon, at his Prudent Limit of Endurance (PLE), was forced to abandon the hunt. Emmerich meanwhile headed for Norway, abandoning his crippled boat the following day. Emmerich and all his crew survived. U-320 was the last U-boat to be sunk in action during the Battle of the Atlantic.

Also on 7 May 1945, U-1023 — a modified Type VIIC/41 under K/L H Schroeteler — sighted a group of Norwegian minesweepers off Portland Bill. In his first successful attack since the patrol started, in March, he struck. His torpedoes hit NYMS 382, which sank with the loss of 22 men.

At around the same time, U-2336 — a Type XXIII under O/L E Klusmeier seven days into her first operational patrol — sighted a British convoy in the Firth of Forth. Firing his two torpedoes, Klusmeier hit freighters Sneland and Avondale Park, which both sank. Nine men were lost altogether. Both U-boats escaped.

These actions took place in the evening of 7 May 1945, just hours before the German surrender.

== Conclusion ==
These were the last ships to be sunk by enemy action in the Battle of the Atlantic, nearly five and a half years after the first shot was fired.
