= SS Sneland I =

Norwegian cargo ship

History
- Name: Sneland I
- Owner: Stange & Dreyer GmbH (1922-1925); Richard Amlie & Sverre Amlie (1925-1945)
- Port of registry: (Norway) Haugesund
- Builder: Nüscke & Co., Stettin-Grabow
- Completed: September 1922
- Identification: Code Letters LCYF–LDWB
- Fate: Torpedoed and sunk, 7 May 1945

General characteristics
- Type: Cargo ship
- Tonnage: 1,791 GRT
- Length: 82 m (269 ft 0 in)
- Beam: 13 m (42 ft 8 in)
- Depth: 5 m (16 ft 5 in)
- Propulsion: Screw propeller
- Crew: 29

Sneland I (Norwegian for "snowland one") was a 1,791 GRT cargo ship which was built by Nüscke & Co. shipyard at Stettin-Grabow (then Germany) in 1922. She was the last merchant ship to be torpedoed by Germany in the Second World War, late on 7 May 1945, less than an hour before German surrender went into effect.

== History ==
The ship was built for the German shipping line Stange & Dreyer GmbH in 1922 and got the name Ingeborg. Three years later, in 1925, it was sold to the Norwegian shipping company Richard Amlie & Sverre Amlie (Amlie & Amlie) in Haugesund, and renamed Sneland I.

On 6 May 1945 the ship was a member of Convoy EN 491, which departed Hull bound for Belfast via Methil. On 7 May 1945, the convoy was attacked by U-2336 and two ships were sunk, Sneland I and Avondale Park, which became the last merchant ships to be sunk by a German U-boat during the Second World War. The sinking, at about 22:45 on 7 May 1945, was in the last hours of the Second World War in Europe, with the official surrender taking place at 23:01 on 8 May 1945.

Sneland I sank at 56°10′N 02°31′W. Seven of the 29 crew were lost. A signal had been sent to the U-boats on 4 May 1945 ordering them to surrender but U-2336 did not receive the signal.

== See also ==
- Actions of 7–8 May 1945
