= German submarine U-2344 =

German World War II submarine

- Postwar photo of Hecht (S 171), (former Type XXIII submarine U-2367). An identical sister ship of U-2344.

History

Nazi Germany
- Name: U-2344
- Ordered: 20 September 1943
- Builder: Deutsche Werft, Hamburg
- Yard number: 498
- Laid down: 4 September 1944
- Launched: 24 October 1944
- Commissioned: 10 November 1944
- Fate: Sunk on 18 February 1945

General characteristics
- Class & type: Type XXIII submarine
- Displacement: 234 t (230 long tons) surfaced; 258 t (254 long tons) submerged
- Length: 34.68 m (113 ft 9 in)
- Beam: 3.02 m (9 ft 11 in)
- Draught: 3.66 m (12 ft)
- Propulsion: 1 × MWM RS134S 6-cylinder diesel engine, 575–630 metric horsepower (423–463 kW; 567–621 shp); 1 × AEG GU4463-8 double-acting electric motor, 580 metric horsepower (427 kW; 572 shp); 1 × BBC CCR188 electric creeping motor, 35 metric horsepower (26 kW; 35 shp)
- Speed: 9.7 knots (18 km/h; 11 mph) surfaced; 12.5 knots (23 km/h; 14 mph) submerged
- Range: 2,600 nautical miles (4,800 km; 3,000 mi) at 8 knots (15 km/h; 9.2 mph) surfaced; 194 nmi (359 km; 223 mi) at 4 knots (7.4 km/h; 4.6 mph) submerged
- Test depth: 180 m (590 ft)
- Complement: 14–18
- Armament: 2 bow torpedo tubes; 2 torpedoes

Service record
- Part of: 32nd U-boat Flotilla; 10 November 1944 – 18 February 1945
- Identification codes: M 45 325
- Commanders: Oblt.z.S. Hermann Ellerlage; 10 November 1944 – 18 February 1945
- Operations: None
- Victories: None

German submarine U-2344 was a Type XXIII U-boat of Nazi Germany's Kriegsmarine during World War II.

== Construction ==
U-2344 was ordered on 20 September 1943 and was laid down on 4 September 1944 at Deutsche Werft, Hamburg, as yard number 498. She was launched on 24 October 1944 and commissioned under the command of Oberleutnant zur See Hermann Ellerlage on 10 November of that year.

== Design ==
Like all Type XXIII U-boats, U-2344 had a displacement of 234 tonnes (230 long tons) when at the surface and 258 tonnes (254 long tons) while submerged. She had a total length of 34.68 m (113 ft 9 in) (o/a), a beam width of 3.02 m (9 ft 11 in) (o/a), and a draught depth of3.66 m (12 ft). The submarine was powered by one MWM six-cylinder RS134S diesel engine providing 575–630 metric horsepower (423–463 kilowatts; 567–621 shaft horsepower), one AEG GU4463-8 double-acting electric motor electric motor providing 580 PS (430 kW; 570 shp), and one BBC silent running CCR188 electric motor providing 35 PS (26 kW; 35 shp).

The submarine had a maximum surface speed of 9.7 knots (18.0 km/h; 11.2 mph) and a submerged speed of 12.5 knots (23.2 km/h; 14.4 mph). When submerged, the boat could operate at 4 knots (7.4 km/h; 4.6 mph) for 194 nautical miles (359 km; 223 mi); when surfaced, she could travel 2,600 nautical miles (4,800 km; 3,000 mi) at 8 knots (15 km/h; 9.2 mph). U-2344 was fitted with two 53.3 cm (21 in) torpedo tubes in the bow. She could carry two preloaded torpedoes. The complement was 14–18 men. This class of U-boat did not carry a deck gun.

== History ==
Like many other late war U-boats, she arrived too late to turn the tide in favor of the Axis powers, despite her advanced design. U-2344 never undertook an operational patrol and was lost on 18 February 1945 after a collision with one of her sister ships, U-2336. She sank quickly in position 54°16′00″N 11°48′30″E, taking 11 of the 14 crew members aboard to the bottom with her. The wreck was subsequently raised for study in 1956, although she was not restored. Ultimately, the hull was broken up at Rostock in 1958.

== See also ==
- Battle of the Atlantic

== Bibliography ==
- Busch, Rainer; Röll, Hans-Joachim (1999). German U-boat commanders of World War II : a biographical dictionary. Translated by Brooks, Geoffrey. London, Annapolis, Md: Greenhill Books, Naval Institute Press. ISBN 1-55750-186-6.
- Gröner, Erich; Jung, Dieter; Maass, Martin (1991). U-boats and Mine Warfare Vessels. German Warships 1815–1945. Vol. 2. Translated by Thomas, Keith; Magowan, Rachel. London: Conway Maritime Press. ISBN 0-85177-593-4.
- Williamson, Gordon (2005). Wolf Pack: The Story of the U-boat in World War II. Osprey. ISBN 1841768723.
