= German submarine U-2336 =

German World War II submarine

- Rendering of a Type XXIII submarine

History

Nazi Germany
- Name: U-2336
- Ordered: 20 September 1943
- Builder: Deutsche Werft, Hamburg
- Yard number: 490
- Laid down: 27 July 1944
- Launched: 10 September 1944
- Commissioned: 30 September 1944
- Fate: Surrendered at Wilhelmshaven, Germany on 15 May 1945. Taken to Lisahally on 21 June 1945 to take part in Operation Deadlight where she was sunk on 3 January 1946 by gunfire from the destroyer HMS Offa.

General characteristics
- Class & type: Type XXIII submarine
- Displacement: 234 t (230 long tons) surfaced; 258 t (254 long tons) submerged
- Length: 34.68 m (113 ft 9 in)
- Beam: 3.02 m (9 ft 11 in)
- Draught: 3.66 m (12 ft)
- Propulsion: 1 × MWM RS134S 6-cylinder diesel engine, 575–630 metric horsepower (423–463 kW; 567–621 shp); 1 × AEG GU4463-8 double-acting electric motor, 580 metric horsepower (427 kW; 572 shp); 1 × BBC CCR188 electric creeping motor, 35 metric horsepower (26 kW; 35 shp)
- Speed: 9.7 knots (18 km/h; 11 mph) surfaced; 12.5 knots (23 km/h; 14 mph) submerged
- Range: 2,600 nautical miles (4,800 km; 3,000 mi) at 8 knots (15 km/h; 9.2 mph) surfaced; 194 nmi (359 km; 223 mi) at 4 knots (7.4 km/h; 4.6 mph) submerged
- Test depth: 180 m (590 ft)
- Complement: 14–18
- Armament: 2 bow torpedo tubes; 2 torpedoes

Service record
- Part of: 32nd U-boat Flotilla; 30 September 1944 – 15 February 1945; 4th U-boat Flotilla; 16 February – 8 May 1945
- Identification codes: M 44 599
- Commanders: Lt.z.S. / Oblt.z.S. Jürgen Vockel; 30 September 1944 – 30 March 1945; Kptlt. Emil Klusmeier; 1 April – 15 May 1945
- Operations: 1 patrol: 1 – 14 May 1945
- Victories: 2 merchant ships sunk (4,669 GRT)

German submarine U-2336 was a Type XXIII U-boat of Nazi Germany's Kriegsmarine during World War II.

U-2336 had a very short career. She only conducted one war patrol and sank only three vessels, one of which was another German U-boat, during an accidental collision (U-2344). Despite her short time in service, U-2336 is known for sinking the last two Allied merchant ships lost to a submarine in the war, when she torpedoed and sank the freighters Avondale Park and Sneland I off the Isle of May inside the Firth of Forth.

After the war, U-2336 was surrendered to the Allies, taken to the British port of Lisahally and sunk in Operation Deadlight on 3 January 1946.

== Construction ==
U-2336 was the 16th U-boat of the Type XXIII class. She was ordered on 20 September 1943, and was laid down on 27 July 1944 at Deutsche Werft, Hamburg, as yard number 490. She was launched on 10 September 1944 and commissioned under the command of Leutnant zur See Jürgen Vockel on 30 September.

== Design ==
Like all Type XXIII U-boats, U-2336 had a displacement of 234 tonnes (230 long tons) when at the surface and 258 tonnes (254 long tons) while submerged. She had a total length of 34.68 m (113 ft 9 in) (o/a), a beam width of 3.02 m (9 ft 11 in) (o/a), and a draught depth of3.66 m (12 ft). The submarine was powered by one MWM six-cylinder RS134S diesel engine providing 575–630 metric horsepower (423–463 kilowatts; 567–621 shaft horsepower), one AEG GU4463-8 double-acting electric motor electric motor providing 580 PS (430 kW; 570 shp), and one BBC silent running CCR188 electric motor providing 35 PS (26 kW; 35 shp).

The submarine had a maximum surface speed of 9.7 knots (18.0 km/h; 11.2 mph) and a submerged speed of 12.5 knots (23.2 km/h; 14.4 mph). When submerged, the boat could operate at 4 knots (7.4 km/h; 4.6 mph) for 194 nautical miles (359 km; 223 mi); when surfaced, she could travel 2,600 nautical miles (4,800 km; 3,000 mi) at 8 knots (15 km/h; 9.2 mph). U-2336 was fitted with two 53.3 cm (21 in) torpedo tubes in the bow. She could carry two preloaded torpedoes. The complement was 14–18 men. This class of U-boat did not carry a deck gun.

== Service history ==
U-2336 trained with the 32nd U-boat Flotilla from 30 September 1944 until 15 February 1945, and began her first voyage as a front boat of the 4th U-boat Flotilla on 16 February 1945. Two days later, she collided with U-2344, another Type XXIII U-boat, off Heiligendamm on the Baltic coast. U-2344 was sunk, with the loss of 11 crew. It took about two months for U-2336 to leave her home port of Kiel, which she did on 18 April 1945 under a new commander, Kapitänleutnant Emil Klusmeier. After traveling across the straits of Kattegat and Skagerrak, U-2336 reached Larvik, Norway on 24 April 1945. This was to be her home port for the remaining few days of the war.

=== First patrol ===
On 1 May 1945, U-2336 left Larvik and headed out into the North Sea. On 7 May 1945, U-2336 sank the last Allied merchant ships to be lost to a German submarine in the war, when she torpedoed the freighters Avondale Park and Sneland I (in order) off the Isle of May inside the Firth of Forth. Sneland I exploded as soon as it was hit and sank two minutes later, killing seven crew members, including the captain. Avondale Park lost two crew members, with the rest entering a lifeboat or jumping into the sea. U-2336 returned to Kiel on 14 May 1945 and then transferred to Wilhelmshaven, Germany, where she was surrendered to the Western Allies.

=== Post-war ===
U-2336 was taken to Lisahally, United Kingdom on 21 June 1945 to take part in Operation Deadlight where she was sunk on 3 January 1946 by gunfire from the British destroyer HMS Offa.

== Summary of raiding history ==
Date	Ship Name	Nationality	Tonnage (Note: Merchant ship tonnages are in gross register tons. Military vessels are listed by tons displacement.)	Fate
7 May 1945	Avondale Park	United Kingdom	2,878	Sunk
7 May 1945	Sneland I	Norway	1,791	Sunk

== See also ==
- Battle of the Atlantic
- Actions of 7–8 May 1945

== Bibliography ==
- Busch, Rainer; Röll, Hans-Joachim (1999). German U-boat commanders of World War II : a biographical dictionary. Translated by Brooks, Geoffrey. London, Annapolis, Md: Greenhill Books, Naval Institute Press. ISBN 1-55750-186-6.
- Busch, Rainer; Röll, Hans-Joachim (1999). Deutsche U-Boot-Verluste von September 1939 bis Mai 1945 [German U-boat losses from September 1939 to May 1945]. Der U-Boot-Krieg (in German). Vol. IV. Hamburg, Berlin, Bonn: Mittler. ISBN 3-8132-0514-2.
- Gröner, Erich; Jung, Dieter; Maass, Martin (1991). U-boats and Mine Warfare Vessels. German Warships 1815–1945. Vol. 2. Translated by Thomas, Keith; Magowan, Rachel. London: Conway Maritime Press. ISBN 0-85177-593-4.
- Williamson, Gordon (2005). Wolf Pack: The Story of the U-boat in World War II. Osprey. ISBN 1841768723.
