= Carl Arnold Kortum =

German physician and writer (1745–1824)

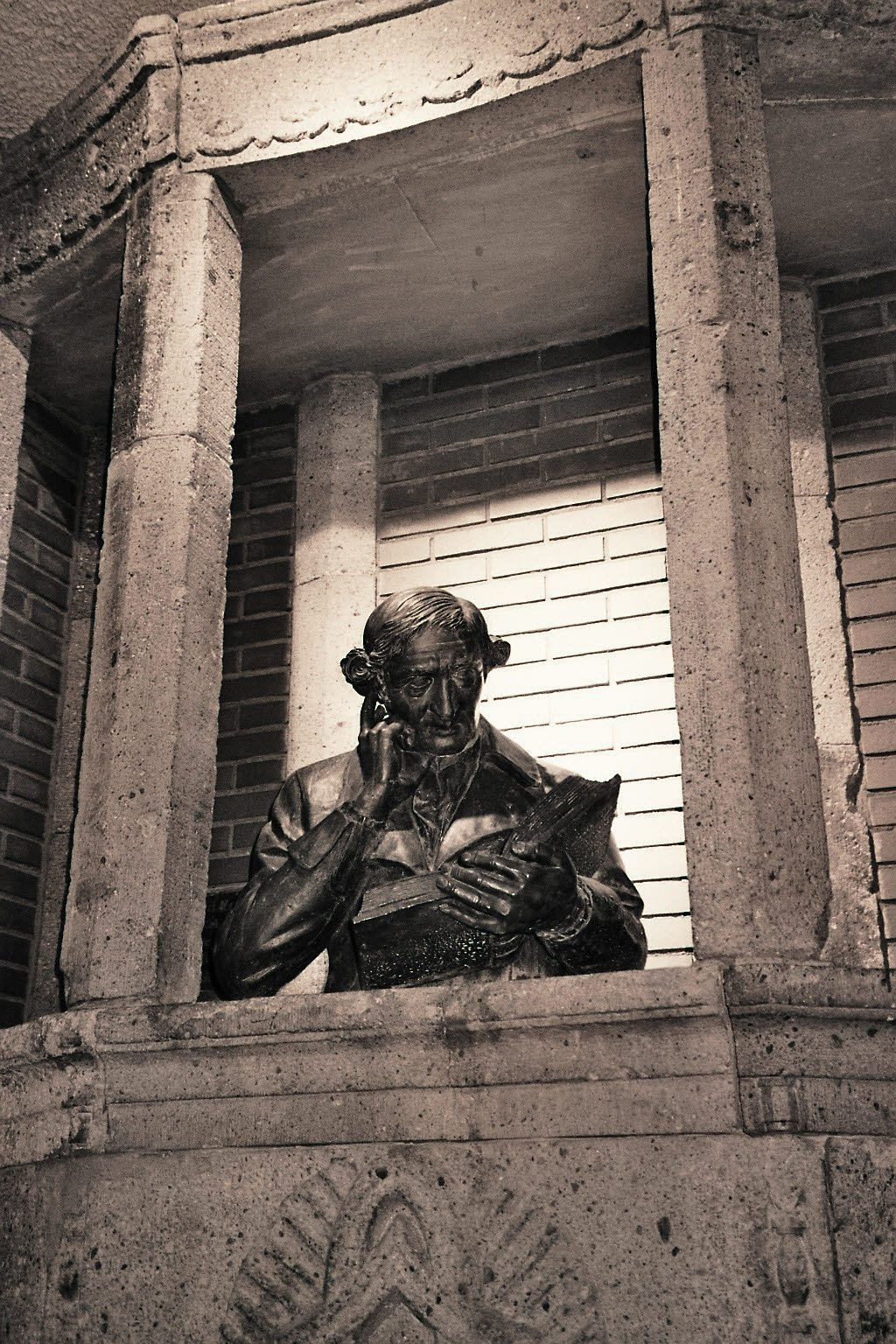
Bust of Kortum in the Bochum subway

Carl Arnold Kortum (July 5, 1745 – August 15, 1824) was a German medical doctor, but best known for his writing and poetry.

Born in Mülheim, Kortum studied medicine and was from 1771 physician in Bochum, where he died in 1824.

Kortum wrote several somewhat popular medical works, but also wrote a number of other less profitable works on various subjects, ranging from beekeeping to antiquarian topics to alchemy. However, he is most well known for his satirical epic poem, Life, Opinions, and Deeds of Hieronymus Jobs the Candidate (Leben, Meinungen und Thaten von Hieronymus Jobs dem Kandidaten), first published anonymously in 1784 and also known as The Jobsiade. He also published a number of other satirical works, but none enjoyed the same level of popularity.

== Selected works ==
- The Martyrs of Fashion (Die Märtyrer der Mode, 1778)
- Life, Opinions, and Deeds of Hieronymus Jobs the Candidate (Leben, Meinungen und Thaten von Hieronymus Jobs dem Kandidaten, 1784), also known as The Jobsiade (Der Jobsiade)
- The Magic Lantern (Die magische Laterne, 1784–86)
- Adams Hochzeitsfeier (1788)
- Defense of Alchemy (Verteidigung der Alchemie, 1789)
- Die Jobsiade : ein grotesk-komisches Heldengedicht in 3 Theilen . Brockhaus, Leipzig 8. Aufl. 1857 Digital edition by the University and State Library Düsseldorf
