= April 1947 =

Month of 1947

<<	April 1947					>>
Su	Mo	Tu	We	Th	Fr	Sa
		1	2	3	4	5
6	7	8	9	10	11	12
13	14	15	16	17	18	19
20	21	22	23	24	25	26
27	28	29	30

The following events occurred in April 1947:

== April 1, 1947 (Tuesday) ==
- Paul of Greece took the throne upon the death of his brother, George II.
- The Industrial Disputes Act came into effect in India.
- Born:
  - Alain Connes, mathematician, in Draguignan, France;
  - Ingrid Steeger, actress and comedian, in Berlin, Germany (d. 2023)
- Died: George II of Greece, 56, King of Greece from 1922-1924 and 1935-1947

== April 2, 1947 (Wednesday) ==
- The Supreme National Tribunal in Poland sentenced Auschwitz concentration camp commandant Rudolf Höss to death.
- The US crime drama series The Big Story was broadcast for the first time on NBC Radio.
- Born:
  - Emmylou Harris, US singer and songwriter, in Birmingham, Alabama
  - Camille Paglia, US academic and social critic, in Endicott, New York

== April 3, 1947 (Thursday) ==
- The private medical company Bupa was founded in the UK.
- The children's TV game show Juvenile Jury hosted by Jack Barry premiered on NBC. Each episode had a panel of kids giving advice to solve the problems of other kids. The program ran until 1954 and would be revived several times thereafter.

== April 4, 1947 (Friday) ==
- Founded: The International Civil Aviation Organization was founded, more popularly known as ICAO
- Amerigo Dumini and two other Italian fascists were sentenced to 30 years imprisonment for the 1924 assassination of the socialist politician Giacomo Matteotti.

== April 5, 1947 (Saturday) ==
- Five US Marines participating in Operation Beleaguer were killed and 16 others wounded in battle with a "dissident" Chinese force that attempted to raid the Marine munitions dump near Tangku.
- Soviet occupation forces in Germany calculated a shortfall of 1.3 million homes in the eastern zone.
- Born: Gloria Macapagal Arroyo, 14th President of the Philippines, in San Juan, Philippines

== April 6, 1947 (Sunday) ==
- The 1st Tony Awards ceremony was held in the Grand Ballroom of the Waldorf Astoria Hotel in New York City. The categories of the awards were rather loosely defined and there was not yet an overall award for Best Play, but recipients included José Ferrer, Fredric March, Ingrid Bergman and Helen Hayes for acting, Elia Kazan for directing and Arthur Miller for writing.
- Jimmy Demaret won the 11th Masters Tournament in Augusta, Georgia.
- Born: John Ratzenberger, actor, in Bridgeport, Connecticut
- Died: Herbert Backe, 50, German Nazi politician (suicide by hanging in his Nuremberg prison cell)

== April 7, 1947 (Monday) ==
- 325,000 telephone workers went on strike in the United States with a variety of demands including a $12 weekly pay boost, increased vacation and pension benefits.
- The Ba'ath Party was founded in Syria.
- Died: Henry Ford, 83, American industrialist and founder of the Ford Motor Company

== April 8, 1947 (Tuesday) ==
- Following a series of killings due to labor strife, the Cuban Interior Ministry banned all political meetings that may provoke disorder.
- The Pohl trial began in Nuremberg. Oswald Pohl and 17 other SS officers went on trial for war crimes and crimes against humanity.
- New York Governor Thomas E. Dewey signed a bill giving the Attorney General power to "restrain" activities of oathbound organizations until they had filed a complete roster of members and other data with the Secretary of State. The law was aimed at tightening controls on communists.
- Born:
  - Tom DeLay, politician, in Laredo, Texas
  - Robert Kiyosaki, businessman, investor and self-help author, in Hilo, Hawaii

== April 9, 1947 (Wednesday) ==
- The Journey of Reconciliation was begun by 16 men from the Congress of Racial Equality to challenge segregation laws on interstate buses in the Southern United States.
- The Glazier–Higgins–Woodward tornadoes swept through Texas, Oklahoma and Kansas, killing at least 181 people.
- Brooklyn Dodgers manager Leo Durocher was suspended for the 1947 season by Baseball Commissioner Happy Chandler for "accumulated unpleasant incidents in which he has been involved, which the commissioner construes as detrimental to baseball."
- Singer Frank Sinatra floored newspaper columnist Lee Mortimer with a punch in the foyer of the Hollywood nightclub Ciro's. Sinatra claimed that Mortimer had insulted him with a racial slur, but the columnist said he didn't even know Sinatra was in the nightclub until he was attacked from behind and held down by two of Sinatra's companions while the singer struck him "two or three more times" and threatened to kill him if he saw him again. Mortimer was known to criticize Sinatra in his newspaper column for his political views and claim that he couldn't sing. Sinatra would be charged with assault, but the charge would be dismissed after he reportedly agreed to pay Mortimer $9,000.

== April 10, 1947 (Thursday) ==
- Britain urged France and Italy to prevent Jews from using their Mediterranean ports to embark for Palestine.
- The United States and Britain agreed to support France's claim on the Saarland.
- Born: Mladen Stilinović, conceptual artist, in Belgrade, Serbia (d. 2016)
- Died:
  - Ernest Flagg, 90, American architect
  - John Ince, 68, American actor and film director; Charles Nordhoff, 60, English-born American novelist and traveler

== April 11, 1947 (Friday) ==
- At the Moscow Conference, Soviet Foreign Minister Vyacheslav Molotov refused to agree to hand over the Saarland to France.
- The Danish Landsting election was held. The Social Democratic Party lost one seat but maintained its plurality with 33 of the 76 seats.
- The black comedy film Monsieur Verdoux directed by and starring Charlie Chaplin was released.
- Born: Meshach Taylor, actor, in Boston, Massachusetts (d. 2014)

== April 12, 1947 (Saturday) ==
- The Big Four conferees at Moscow agreed that major German war plants should be destroyed by June 30, 1948.
- Mobster Lucky Luciano was taken ashore by police at Genoa and booked on charges of clandestine expatriation because of his departure from Italy to Cuba in late 1946. Luciano had previously been deported to Italy by the United States after his release from a long prison term.
- Born:
  - Tom Clancy, novelist, in Baltimore, Maryland (d. 2013)
  - David Letterman, comedian and television talk show host, in Indianapolis, Indiana

== April 13, 1947 (Sunday) ==
- The site of the future Headquarters of the United Nations was formally dedicated in New York City. UN Secretary-General Trygve Lie declared: "We are proud to have the world capital of the United Nations established here in this great melting pot of the peoples of the world." The UN planned to have its first building on the site completed by the fall of 1948.
- Born: Mike Chapman, record producer and songwriter, in Nambour, Queensland, Australia
- Died: Jean Chassagne, 65, French submariner, aviator and race car driver

== April 14, 1947 (Monday) ==
- The Douglas D-558-1 Skystreak had its first flight.
- The United States Court of Appeals for the Ninth Circuit decided Mendez v. Westminster, affirming a district court ruling that the segregation of Mexican and Mexican American students into separate "Mexican schools" in Orange County, California was unconstitutional. It was the first ruling in the United States in favor of desegregation.
- The United States Supreme Court decided Crane v. Commissioner.
- The comic strip Grandma by Charles Kuhn made its debut. The strip would run through 1969.
- Charles de Gaulle founded the Rally of the French People (French: Rassemblement du Peuple Français, RPF), a French political party.

== April 15, 1947 (Tuesday) ==
- Jackie Robinson broke the 50-year color barrier in major league baseball when he stepped onto Ebbets Field in Brooklyn to play for the Brooklyn Dodgers. Robinson went 0-for-3 with a sacrifice bunt and two runs scored as the Dodgers defeated the Boston Braves, 5-3.
- On Budget Day in the United Kingdom, Chancellor of the Exchequer Hugh Dalton announced that the deficit in 1946-47 had only been £569 million, which was £157 million lower than expected. Dalton projected a £248 million surplus for 1947-48.
- A 90-minute nighttime meeting took place in the Kremlin between Joseph Stalin and US Secretary of State George Marshall. Also in attendance for the Soviets were Foreign Minister Vyacheslav Molotov and ambassador Nikolai Novikov, and on the American side the diplomats Walter Bedell Smith and Charles E. Bohlen. Marshall expressed a deep concern at the extent of the rift between the US and Soviet sides that had been made apparent during the ongoing Moscow conference, but Stalin did not think the situation so tragic and explained that after people had exhausted themselves in dispute, they then recognized the need to compromise.
- Born:
  - Lois Chiles, actress and model, in Houston, Texas
  - Don Marcotte, ice hockey player, in Arthabaska, Quebec, Canada
  - Roy Raymond, businessman and founder of the Victoria's Secret company, in Connecticut (d. 1993)

== April 16, 1947 (Wednesday) ==
- Texas City disaster: The deadliest industrial accident in United States history occurred in the Port of Texas City when 2,300 tons of ammonium nitrate aboard a French cargo vessel exploded, triggering a chain reaction of explosions and other fires that killed at least 581 people and injured over 5,000.
- Born:
  - Kareem Abdul-Jabbar, basketball player, in New York City
  - Gerry Rafferty, singer-songwriter, in Paisley, Renfrewshire, Scotland (d. 2011)
- Died:
  - Guido Donegani, 70, Italian engineer, businessman and politician
  - Rudolf Höss, 45, SS-Obersturmbannführer and commandant of Auschwitz concentration camp, hanged as a war criminal
  - Huỳnh Phú Sổ, 27, founder of the Hòa Hảo religious movement

== April 17, 1947 (Thursday) ==
- The Milch Trial concluded in Nuremberg. Erhard Milch was found guilty of war crimes and responsible for slave labor, but was acquitted of the charge of having knowingly and willfully participated in fatal medical experiments. Milch was sentenced to life in prison.
- In Rome, a mob of about a thousand unemployed workers staged a noisy protest outside the Parliament building, stopping private cars and sometimes beating the occupants. One of those assaulted was Italian Foreign Minister Carlo Sforza, who was struck by several fists as he stepped out of his car to go to his office. The Foreign Ministry said that Sforza had been shaken but not seriously hurt.

== April 18, 1947 (Friday) ==
- The British Navy blew up the German naval base at Heligoland with 3,500 tons of explosives. The largest non-atomic explosion ever attempted by man, the blast was reportedly heard as far away as Hamburg and created a red-tinted mushroom cloud twice the size of the island.
- Born:
  - Kathy Acker, author, in New York City (d. 1997)
  - Jerzy Stuhr, actor and filmmaker, in Kraków, Poland (d. 2024)
  - James Woods, actor and producer, in Vernal, Utah
- Died:
  - Benny Leonard, 51, American lightweight boxing champion (heart attack while refereeing a bout)
  - Jozef Tiso, 59, Slovak Roman Catholic priest and President of Slovakia from 1939 to 1945 (hanged for treason)

== April 19, 1947 (Saturday) ==
- The Flick Trial began in Nuremberg. Friedrich Flick and five other leading Nazi industrialists were put on trial for using slave labor, among other crimes.
- The Toronto Maple Leafs defeated the Montreal Canadiens 2-1 to win hockey's Stanley Cup, four games to two.
- Suh Yun-bok won the Boston Marathon in a world record time of 2:25:39.
- Born: Murray Perahia, concert pianist and conductor, in the Bronx, New York
- Died: Charles Bidwill, 51, American businessman, lawyer and owner of the NFL's Chicago Cardinals

== April 20, 1947 (Sunday) ==
- Frederik IX of Denmark took the throne upon the death of his father Christian X.
- NBC Radio cut off a broadcast of The Fred Allen Show for twenty-five seconds because the host refused to change his script. The censored bit started off with another actor asking Allen why the program was cut off the previous week. Allen explained, "Well, there's a little man in the company we work for. He's a vice president in charge of program ends. When our program runs overtime, he marks down how much time is saved." Allen was then asked, "What does he do with all this time?" to which he replied: "He adds it all up, 10 seconds here, 20 seconds there, and when the vice president saves up enough seconds, minutes and hours to make two weeks, he uses the two weeks of our time for his vacation." Allen described NBC's action as "sheer stupidity. The radio industry is 25 years old, but some people in it are keeping it in its infancy by such action as this."
- Born: Hector, singer-songwriter, as Heikki Veikko Harma in Helsinki, Finland
- Died:
  - Christian X of Denmark, 76, King of Denmark from 1912 to 1947
  - Louis R. de Steiguer, 80, American admiral

== April 21, 1947 (Monday) ==
- Princess Elizabeth gave a radio address on her twenty-first birthday from Cape Town, South Africa. "I declare before you all that my whole life, whether it be long or short, shall be devoted to your service and the service of our great imperial family to which we all belong," Elizabeth said.
- Born: Iggy Pop, rock musician, as James Newell Osterberg, Jr. in Muskegon, Michigan

== April 22, 1947 (Tuesday) ==
- The Philadelphia Warriors beat the Chicago Stags 83-80 to win the inaugural Basketball Association of America championship, four games to one.
- During a game between the Philadelphia Phillies and the Brooklyn Dodgers, a torrent of racist insults were shouted at Jackie Robinson from the Phillies dugout at the instigation of manager Ben Chapman, which, as Robinson later recalled, "brought me nearer to cracking up than I ever had been." Chapman's behavior angered Robinson's white teammates, and Branch Rickey later commented that "Chapman did more than anybody to unite the Dodgers."
- A photo finish camera was used at Epsom Downs Racecourse for the first time.

== April 23, 1947 (Wednesday) ==
- The War Crimes Tribunal in Rabaul sentenced Japanese general Hatazō Adachi to life imprisonment on a charge of being responsible for the atrocities committed by his troops.
- In Moscow, the Big Four powers agreed to a deadline of December 31, 1948 to repatriate all of the nearly 2 million German prisoners of war still in Allied hands.

== April 24, 1947 (Thursday) ==
- The Big Four Conference in Moscow adjourned with an agreement to meet again later in the year.
- Jewish insurgency: four British policemen were killed and six others wounded in an explosion at the police barracks in Sarona, Palestine. The bombs were thought to have been planted by the Stern Gang.
- General Motors and United Auto Workers settled a wage dispute when UAW approved an 11½ cent increase in hourly wages for 220,000 GM workers.
- The detective drama radio series Johnny Madero, Pier 23 premiered on the Mutual Broadcasting System.
- Born: Richard Fagan, songwriter and musician, in Philadelphia, Pennsylvania (d. 2016)
- Died: Willa Cather, 73, American author

== April 25, 1947 (Friday) ==
- General elections were held in Japan. The Socialist Party won 144 of the 466 seats, making it the largest party in the House of Representatives by an eight-seat margin.
- Born: Johan Cruyff, footballer and coach, in Amsterdam, Netherlands (d. 2016)
- Died: Ana Cumpănaș, 57 or 58, Austro-Hungarian-born Romanian prostitute known as the "Woman in Red" who helped lead the FBI to John Dillinger in 1934 (liver disease)

== April 26, 1947 (Saturday) ==
- Charlton Athletic defeated Burnley 1-0 in the FA Cup Final at Wembley Stadium.
- The stage musical Bless the Bride with music by Vivian Ellis and book and lyrics by A. P. Herbert premiered at the Adelphi Theatre in London's West End.
- Born: Amos Otis, baseball player, in Mobile, Alabama
- Died: Hisao Tani, 64, Japanese general (executed for war crimes)

== April 27, 1947 (Sunday) ==
- "Babe Ruth Day" was observed by organized baseball all around the world. Ruth himself gave an address from home plate in Yankee Stadium thanking everyone, and what he and others had to say was piped to other ballparks. In Japan, special exhibition events were held at Korakuen and Nishinomiya Stadiums in which lottery prizes for spectators included pictures of Ruth.
- Gentleman's Agreement by Laura Z. Hobson topped The New York Times Fiction Best Sellers list.

== April 28, 1947 (Monday) ==
- The United Nations General Assembly met to consider the issue of Palestine.
- The Kon-Tiki expedition departed from Callao, Peru. Thor Heyerdahl led a six-man crew aboard a wooden raft trying to sail to the Polynesian islands in an attempt to prove his theory that South Americans in pre-Columbian times could have settled Polynesia.
- Born: Ken St. Andre, fantasy author and game designer, in Ogden, Utah (d. 2026)

== April 29, 1947 (Tuesday) ==
- The Indian Constituent Assembly outlawed untouchability.
- Born: Tommy James, pop-rock musician (Tommy James and the Shondells) and producer, in Dayton, Ohio
- Died:
  - Karel Čurda (35), Czech collaborator, hanged in Prague
  - Irving Fisher (80), economist, in New York City

== April 30, 1947 (Wednesday) ==
- US President Harry S. Truman signed legislation changing the name of Boulder Dam to Hoover Dam, after the 31st President, Herbert Hoover.
- Born: Leslie Grantham, actor, in Camberwell, London, England (d. 2018)
- Died: Almroth Wright, 85, British bacteriologist and immunologist
