= January 1947 =

Month of 1947

| << | January 1947 | | | | | >> |
| Su | Mo | Tu | We | Th | Fr | Sa |
| | | | 1 | 2 | 3 | 4 |
| 5 | 6 | 7 | 8 | 9 | 10 | 11 |
| 12 | 13 | 14 | 15 | 16 | 17 | 18 |
| 19 | 20 | 21 | 22 | 23 | 24 | 25 |
| 26 | 27 | 28 | 29 | 30 | 31 |

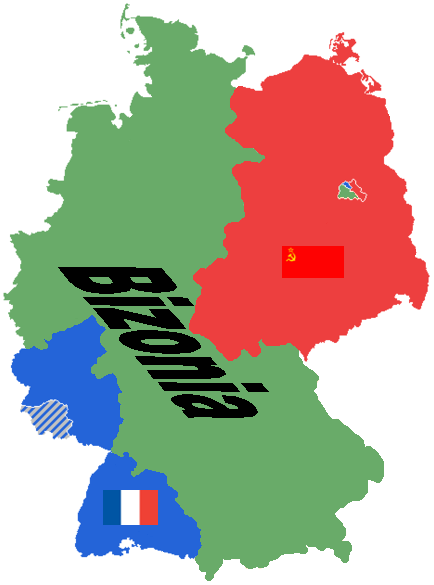
January 1, 1947: "Bizonia" created in western Germany by merger of the U.S. and British occupation zones.

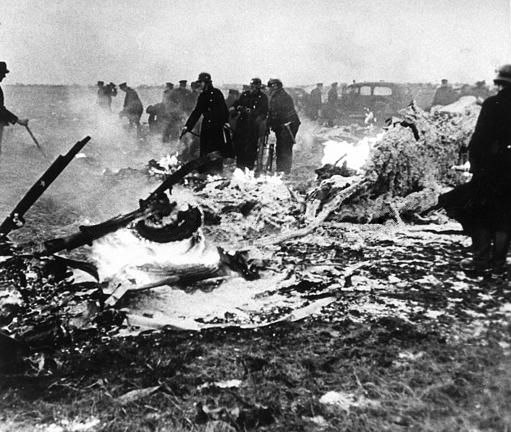
January 26, 1947: Crash of KLM DC-3 airplane in Denmark kills all 22 passengers and crew, including Prince Gustaf, second in line for the throne of King of Sweden.

The following events occurred in January 1947:

== January 1, 1947 (Wednesday) ==
- Britain and the United States merged their German occupation zones to form Bizonia. The area constituted what would become the states of Schleswig-Holstein, Hamburg, Lower Saxony, Bremen, North Rhine-Westphalia, Hesse, Bavaria, and Württemberg-Baden.
- The National Coal Board took over the British coal mining industry.
- 1947 Sydney hailstorm: Sydney, Australia was hit with the most severe storm since recorded observations began in 1792. About 1,000 people were injured and approximately GB£750,000 in damages were done.
- The Canadian Citizenship Act went into effect.
- King George VI bestowed the 1947 New Year Honours.
- In college bowl games across the United States, the Illinois Fighting Illini beat the UCLA Bruins 45–14 in the Rose Bowl, the Rice Owls shut out the Tennessee Volunteers 8–0 in the Orange Bowl, the Cincinnati Bearcats defeated the Virginia Tech Hokies 18–6 in the Sun Bowl and the Georgia Bulldogs beat the North Carolina Tar Heels 20–10 in the Sugar Bowl, while the Cotton Bowl Classic between the Arkansas Razorbacks and the LSU Tigers ended in a 0–0 tie.
- Born: F. R. David, Tunisian-born French singer, in Menzel Bourguiba; Leon Patillo, Christian singer and evangelist, in San Francisco, California; Vladimir Georgiyevich Titov, cosmonaut, in Stretensk, Zabaykalsky Krai, USSR

== January 2, 1947 (Thursday) ==
- The Milch Trial began in Nuremberg, Germany. Luftwaffe field marshal Erhard Milch stood accused of war crimes and crimes against humanity.
- Born: Jack Hanna, zoologist, in Knoxville, Tennessee

== January 3, 1947 (Friday) ==
- The 80th United States Congress first met. Proceedings of Congress were televised for the first time when cameras were allowed into the House Chamber to broadcast the opening address of House Speaker Joe Martin.
- Died: Al Herpin, 84?, notable American insomniac known as "The Man Who Never Slept"

== January 4, 1947 (Saturday) ==
- This is the cover date of the first issue of the weekly German news magazine Der Spiegel.
- The progressive political organization Americans for Democratic Action (ADA) was formed in Washington.
- Hardin–Simmons Cowboys beat the Denver Pioneers in the first ever Alamo Bowl, held at Alamo Stadium in San Antonio, Texas. Only 3,730 people attended the Bowl and it was never held again.
- Born: Chris Cutler, American-born English percussionist, in Washington, D.C.

== January 5, 1947 (Sunday) ==
- A Douglas DC-4 of the China National Aviation Corporation crashed into a mountain at Tsintao, China while on approach in overcast conditions, killing all 38 aboard.
- A general election was held in Bolivia; Enrique Hertzog of the Republican Socialist Unity Party was narrowly elected president.
- Born: Mercury Morris, American football running back, in Pittsburgh, Pennsylvania (d. 2024)

== January 6, 1947 (Monday) ==
- U.S. President Harry S. Truman gave the State of the Union address, telling the new Republican-dominated Congress that they would have to work with him for the common good. It was the first State of the Union address to be televised live.
- In London, 5,000 truck drivers suddenly went out on strike, demanding a 44-hour work week and pay raises. The number of strikers would rise to 50,000 over the next ten days as more transportation workers and sympathy strikers would join the work stoppage.
- British Army Field Marshal Bernard Montgomery arrived in Moscow for a five-day visit to the Soviet Union. Montgomery told Soviet radio that the purpose of his visit was to "establish friendly contact with the Soviet Army and I hope that from that friendly contact there may develop and grow a mutual understanding, a mutual confidence, a happy relationship between our two armies which will be for the mutual benefit of us all."
- Born: Sandy Denny, folk rock singer and songwriter, in Merton Park, London, England (d. 1978)

== January 7, 1947 (Tuesday) ==
- In a surprise announcement, James F. Byrnes resigned as United States Secretary of State on the advice of his physicians. President Truman accepted the resignation "with great reluctance and heartfelt regret" and named George Marshall as Byrnes' successor.
- Died: Charles Sumner Woolworth, 90, American entrepreneur and Chairman of the F. W. Woolworth Company from 1919 to 1944

== January 8, 1947 (Wednesday) ==
- British steel works closed down due to a lack of coal.
- Polish Peasant Party leader Stanisław Mikołajczyk announced that his party would field candidates in 42 of Poland's 52 electoral districts in the January 19 election, but threatened to boycott elections in the remaining 10 districts where the government had denied his party a list of candidates. Mikołajczyk's announcement had been anxiously awaited by the nation; a move to boycott all 52 districts might have pushed Poland toward civil war.
- Born: David Bowie, singer, songwriter, producer and actor, in Brixton, London, England (d. 2016); Samuel Schmid, politician, in Rüti bei Büren, Switzerland; Terry Sylvester, pop singer, in Allerton, Liverpool, England; Laurie Walters, actress, in San Francisco, California

== January 9, 1947 (Thursday) ==
- Jan Malypetr, who served three stints as Prime Minister of Czechoslovakia from 1932 to 1935, was acquitted by the Prague national court of charges of supporting the Nazi and fascist movements.
- Born: Ronnie Landfield, abstract painter, in the Bronx, New York
- Died: Herman Bing, 47, German-born American actor; Karl Mannheim, 53, Hungarian sociologist

== January 10, 1947 (Friday) ==
- The United Nations adopted Security Council Resolution 16, recognizing the establishment of the Free Territory of Trieste.
- President Truman submitted to Congress the first balanced federal budget since 1930. In defiance of the challenge from the Republican Congress, Truman's budget did not include tax cuts.
- The Burngrange mining disaster killed 15 miners in the Scottish village of West Calder.
- The stage musical Finian's Rainbow by E.Y. Harburg and Fred Saidy with music by Burton Lane opened at the 46th Street Theatre on Broadway.
- Born: Peer Steinbrück, politician, in Hamburg, Germany
- Died: Arthur E. Andersen, 61, American accountant and founder of the Arthur Andersen accounting firm

== January 11, 1947 (Saturday) ==
- Italy's Socialist Party split into three factions over the issue of whether to collaborate with the Communists.
- The Afghan tribal revolts of 1944–1947 concluded with the Surrender at Datta Khel.
- The 1947 BOAC Douglas C-47 crash killed eight people at Stowting, Kent, England.
- Born: Mart Smeets, radio and television personality and writer, in Arnhem, Netherlands
- Died: Eva Tanguay, 68, Canadian singer and entertainer

== January 12, 1947 (Sunday) ==
- Jewish insurgency in Mandatory Palestine: a Stern Gang member drove a truck full of explosives into the central police station compound in Haifa and detonated it, killing 5 and wounding 140.
- With the London transportation strike almost a week old, the British government called on the military to drive trucks supplying the city with food starting the next morning.
- Died: Zdenko Blažeković, 31, Croatian fascist politician (executed)

== January 13, 1947 (Monday) ==
- Oswald Pohl and 17 other SS officers was indicted by U.S. authorities in Nuremberg.
- The United States Supreme Court decided Louisiana ex rel. Francis v. Resweber. The 5–4 decision ruled that imposing capital punishment a second time, after the first attempt to execute 17-year old convicted murderer Willie Francis by electric chair failed, did not violate the Constitution.
- The Technicolor fantasy film Sinbad the Sailor starring Douglas Fairbanks, Jr., Maureen O'Hara, Walter Slezak and Anthony Quinn was released.

== January 14, 1947 (Tuesday) ==
- The USSR and Norway signed a two-year renewable trade treaty as Moscow denounced the 1920 Svalbard Treaty giving Norway sovereignty over the Spitzbergen islands. TASS claimed that the Svalbard Treaty had been signed without Russia's knowledge and in disregard of Soviet interests.
- Over 2,000 London dock workers voted to walk off the job in sympathy with the striking transport workers.
- The Western film California starring Ray Milland, Barbara Stanwyck and Barry Fitzgerald premiered in New York City.
- Born: Stuart Baird, film editor and director, in England; Bill Werbeniuk, professional snooker player, in Winnipeg, Canada (d. 2003)
- Died: Bill Hewitt, 37, American football player (car accident)

== January 15, 1947 (Wednesday) ==
- The U.S. State Department claimed that Norway and the USSR could not modify the 1920 pact over the Spitzbergen Islands without consulting the United States, which was also a signatory to the treaty.

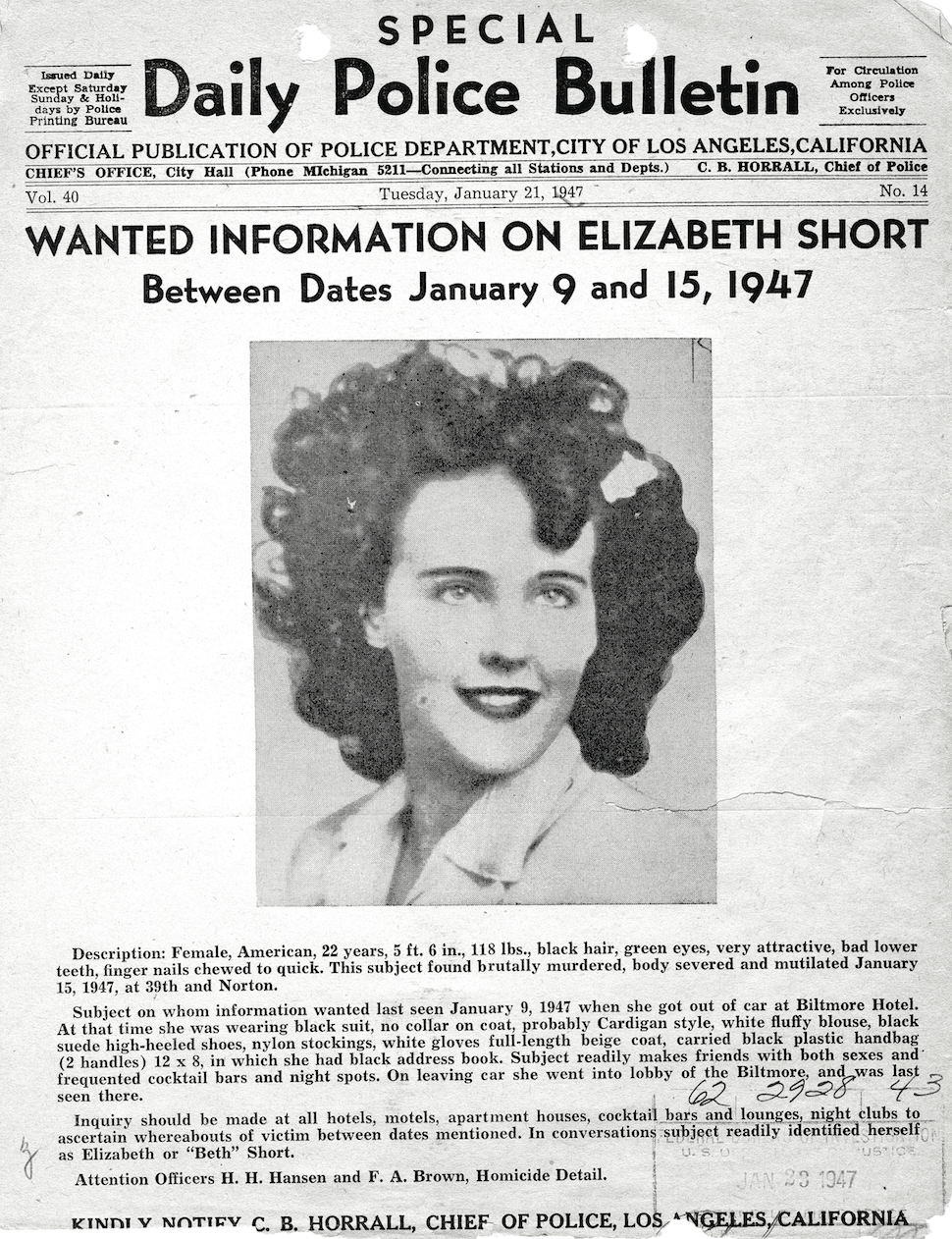
Elizabeth Short, "the Black Dahlia"

- The mutilated body of 22-year-old aspiring actress Elizabeth Short, who would become popularly known as "Black Dahlia", was discovered in Leimert Park, Los Angeles. The murder became a media sensation but would never be solved.
- Born:
  - Andrea Martin, actress, singer, author and comedian, in Portland, Maine
  - Michael Schanze, television presenter, actor and singer, in Tutzing, Germany
- Died: Jimmy Sheckard, 68, American baseball player

== January 16, 1947 (Thursday) ==
- Vincent Auriol became President of France.
- The London transportation strike was settled. The strikers' demands were to be considered by an adjustment board.
- Born: Apasra Hongsakula, model and Miss Universe 1965, in Bangkok, Thailand; Laura Schlessinger, talk radio host and commentator, in Brooklyn, New York
- Died: Helmuth von Pannwitz, 48, German general (executed in Moscow for war crimes)

== January 17, 1947 (Friday) ==
- The day after taking office, new French President Auriol selected Paul Ramadier to form the next government to replace Léon Blum, who was stepping down for health reasons.
- In Muiden, Netherlands, a truck loaded with 150-pound (68 kg) German shells exploded, killing 14 Dutch soldiers and two civilians.
- Born: Sachio Kinugasa, former Japanese professional baseball player (Hiroshima Carp), played in a world record 2,215 consecutive professional baseball games from 1970 to 1987, in Higashiyama-ku, Kyoto (d. 2018)

== January 18, 1947 (Saturday) ==
- The Pittsburgh Pirates baseball team purchased the contract of veteran slugger Hank Greenberg from the Detroit Tigers for $75,000.
- Born: Takeshi Kitano, comedian, television personality and filmmaker, in Adachi, Tokyo, Japan
- Died: K. L. Saigal, 42, Indian singer and actor

== January 19, 1947 (Sunday) ==
- Parliamentary elections were held in Poland, the first since World War II. According to official results, the Democratic Bloc headed by Communist leader Bolesław Bierut gained 80.1% of the vote.
- The Greek ferry ship Chimarra struck a mine and sank off Kavalliani with the loss of about 300 lives.
- Born: Paula Deen, celebrity chef and cooking show television host, in Albany, Georgia; Rod Evans, original lead singer of the rock band Deep Purple, in Eton, Berkshire, England
- Died: Manuel Machado, 72, Spanish poet and playwright

== January 20, 1947 (Monday) ==
- Britain's Labour Government issued a White Paper urging workers to increase production without demanding higher wages in return in order to spare Britain from an "extremely serious" economic situation.
- Alcide De Gasperi resigned as Prime Minister of Italy after admitting inability to handle the present political situation.
- Died: Josh Gibson, 35, American Negro league baseball player and 1972 inductee to the Hall of Fame (stroke); Andrew Volstead, 86, American politician associated with the Volstead Act which established prohibition in the United States

== January 21, 1947 (Tuesday) ==
- The first of several severe cold spells began in the United Kingdom, bringing large drifts of snow to the country that blocked roads and railways.
- George Marshall became 50th United States Secretary of State.
- Strom Thurmond became 103rd Governor of South Carolina.
- Mickey Cochrane, Frankie Frisch, Lefty Grove and Carl Hubbell were elected to the Baseball Hall of Fame.
- Born: Jill Eikenberry, actress, in New Haven, Connecticut

== January 22, 1947 (Wednesday) ==
- Paul Ramadier became Prime Minister of France.
- KTLA-TV went on the air in Los Angeles, the first television station west of the Mississippi River. It broadcast a 30-minute variety show from the Paramount TV theatre starring Bob Hope, Dorothy Lamour, William Bendix and Jerry Colonna.
- Born:
  - Senichi Hoshino, former Japanese professional baseball pitcher and coach, Kurashiki, Okayama Prefecture (d. 2018)
- Died: Vivienne Haigh-Wood Eliot, 58, English governess and writer

== January 23, 1947 (Thursday) ==
- The International Olympic Committee announced that Germany and Japan would not be taking part in the 1948 Olympic Games.
- Former president Herbert Hoover accepted an assignment from President Truman to undertake a mission to central Europe to study the food situation and other problems.
- Born: Tom Carper, politician, in Beckley, West Virginia; Megawati Sukarnoputri, 5th President of Indonesia, in Yogyakarta, Indonesia
- Died: Pierre Bonnard, 79, French Post-Impressionist painter and printmaker

== January 24, 1947 (Friday) ==
- The prosecution rested in the war crimes trial of Hideki Tojo and 24 other Japanese wartime leaders.
- Born: Michio Kaku, Japanese-American futurist and theoretical physicist, in San Jose, California; Masashi Ozaki, Japanese golfer, in Kaifu District, Tokushima, Japan; Warren Zevon, American singer-songwriter, in Los Angeles, California (d. 2003)

== January 25, 1947 (Saturday) ==
- The 1947 Croydon Dakota accident killed 12 people at Croydon Airport, London.
- Dimitrios Maximos became Prime Minister of Greece.
- Born: Tostão, footballer, in Belo Horizonte, Brazil
- Died: Al Capone, 48, American gangster (cardiac arrest)

== January 26, 1947 (Sunday) ==
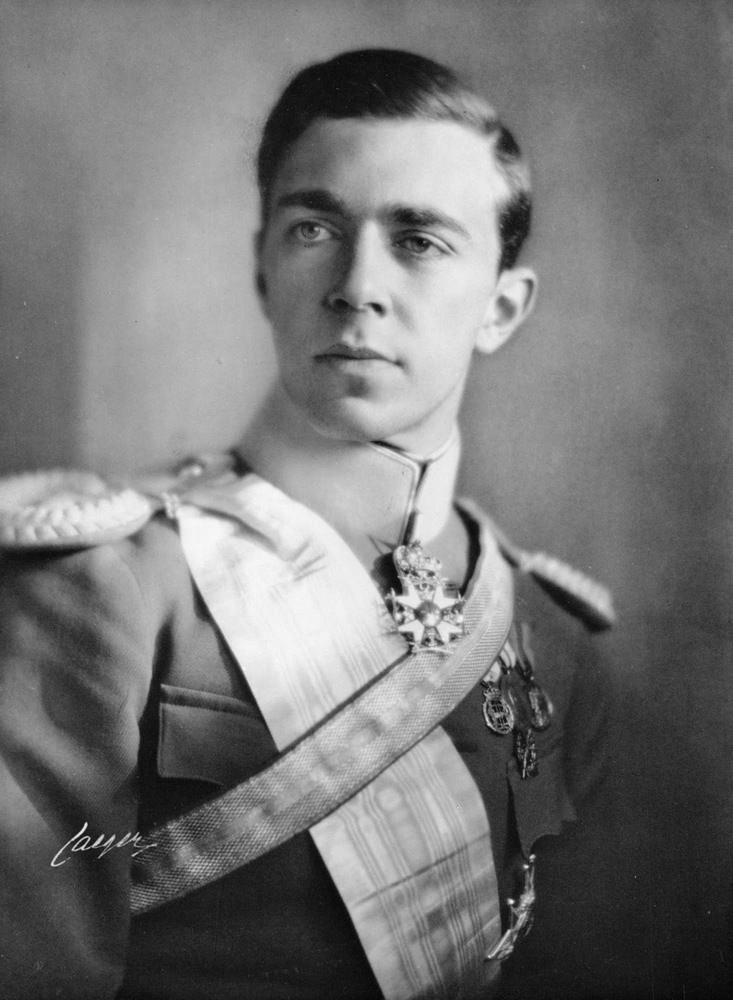
The man who might have been King Gustav VII Adolf of Sweden

- The 1947 KLM Douglas DC-3 Copenhagen accident killed all 22 passengers and crew of a Douglas DC-3 that crashed after takeoff from Kastrup in Denmark.
- Died: Grace Moore, 48, American operatic soprano and actress; Prince Gustaf Adolf, Duke of Västerbotten, 40, Swedish prince (killed in the KLM Douglas DC-3 Copenhagen accident)

== January 27, 1947 (Monday) ==
- British Prime Minister Clement Attlee announced that British troops would be withdrawn from Egypt.
- The new Greek Prime Minister Dimitrios Maximos announced that the government was prepared to offer general amnesty to all guerrilla bands willing to capitulate in order to end the Greek Civil War.
- Born: Björn Afzelius, singer-songwriter and guitarist, in Huskvarna, Sweden (d. 1999); Vyron Polydoras, politician, in Perivolia, Greece; Cal Schenkel, artist specialising in album cover design, in Willow Grove, Pennsylvania; Philip Sugden, historian, in Hull, England (d. 2014)
- Died: Vassily Balabanov, 73, Russian politician

== January 28, 1947 (Tuesday) ==
- Prime Minister Attlee presented a plan for Burmese independence to Parliament, calling for the election of a Constituent Assembly in April and an interim government "conducted generally in the same manner as the Interim Government of India at the present time."
- The U.S. State Department accused the Polish government of failing to carry out free elections as required in the Yalta and Potsdam agreements.
- The short story collection Tales of the South Pacific by James A. Michener was published.

== January 29, 1947 (Wednesday) ==
- Harry S. Truman became the first president to address the National Association for the Advancement of Colored People.
- The Arthur Miller stage play All My Sons premiered at the Coronet Theatre on Broadway.
- Born: Linda B. Buck, biologist, in Seattle, Washington; David Byron, lead singer of the rock band Uriah Heep, as David Garrick in Epping, Essex, England (d. 1985)
- Died: Del Gainer, 60, American baseball player

== January 30, 1947 (Thursday) ==
- The month-long Battle of Guanzhong ended in victory for the Chinese Communist forces.
- English stage actor Harold Norman was fatally wounded by a dagger while playing the title role during a performance of William Shakespeare's play Macbeth in Oldham, in the scene of Macbeth's fight with Macduff. After two operations, Norman would die of his injury in February.
- Tornadoes in the southern United States killed 20 people.
- A 10-day blizzard began in the Canadian Prairies that would be remembered as one of Canada's worst winter storms of the 20th century. Towns and trains from Winnipeg to Calgary were buried under snow while some rural roads and railways in Saskatchewan would remain closed until spring.
- Born: Ileana Jacket, German-born Venezuelan actress, in Leverkusen; Steve Marriott, rock musician, in Manor Park, London, England (d. 1991)
- Died: Frederick Blackman, 80, British plant physiologist

== January 31, 1947 (Friday) ==
- British High Commissioner for Palestine Lt. General Alan Cunningham ordered all "non-essential" British civilians to evacuate the province. It was officially announced that all wives and children of officers in Palestine who were British subjects would be evacuated by February 4 "so military operations in Palestine will not be hampered."
- Born: Nolan Ryan, baseball player, in Refugio, Texas
