= March 1947 =

Month of 1947

<<	March 1947					>>
Su	Mo	Tu	We	Th	Fr	Sa
						1
2	3	4	5	6	7	8
9	10	11	12	13	14	15
16	17	18	19	20	21	22
23	24	25	26	27	28	29
30	31

The following events occurred in March 1947:

== March 1, 1947 (Saturday) ==
- Irgun operatives blew up a British officers' club in Jerusalem, killing 16. Three more British soldiers were killed that night in subsequent violence throughout the Holy Land.
- Chiang Kai-shek accepted the resignation of T. V. Soong as Premier of China and assumed the office himself.
- International Monetary Fund becomes operational.
- "Managua, Nicaragua" by Freddy Martin and His Orchestra hit #1 on the Billboard Best Sellers in Stores record chart.
- Born: Alan Thicke, actor and television host, in Kirkland Lake, Ontario, Canada (d. 2016)

== March 2, 1947 (Sunday) ==
- The British Army imposed martial law on a wide area of Palestine and made 60 arrests in connection with the previous day's violence.
- Born: Yuri Bogatyryov, actor, in Riga, Latvian SSR, Soviet Union (d. 1989)
- Died: Frans Johan Louwrens Ghijsels, 64, Dutch architect and urban planner

== March 3, 1947 (Monday) ==
- One minute after midnight, electric power was restored for all British industrial plants still idle since the three-week shutdown began.
- Joseph Stalin relinquished the post of Minister of the Armed Forces of the Soviet Union and appointed Nikolai Bulganin to the position.
- The Italian cargo steamship Luana, transporting bauxite from Manfredonia to Venice, wandered into one of the uncleared minefields southeast of Cape Kamenjak, struck a mine, and sank; twelve crew members were killed.
- Born: Jennifer Warnes, singer, songwriter, arranger and record producer, in Seattle, Washington; Tommy Blom, singer, songwriter in Gothenburg, Sweden (d. 2014); Óscar Washington Tabárez, former Uruguayan football player and manager, include a coach of Uruguay National Football Team (1988-1990, 2006-2021), in Montevideo

== March 4, 1947 (Tuesday) ==
- France and the United Kingdom signed the Treaty of Dunkirk, a pact of alliance and mutual assistance.
- 517 leftists were arrested by the Greek government and immediately deported to the islands.
- Villarbasse massacre: The last execution for common crimes in Italy took place in Turin when three Sicilians were shot by firing squad for clubbing ten people to death while committing a robbery.
- Born: Jan Garbarek, saxophonist, in Mysen, Norway; Gunnar Hansen, actor and author, in Reykjavík, Iceland (d. 2015)

== March 5, 1947 (Wednesday) ==
- The Judges' Trial began in Nuremberg. 15 German jurists and lawyers stood accused of Nazi war crimes. A sixteenth defendant, Carl Westphal, was indicted but had committed suicide before the trial began.
- Born: Kent Tekulve, baseball player, in Cincinnati, Ohio
- Died: Alfredo Casella, 63, Italian composer, pianist and conductor

== March 6, 1947 (Thursday) ==
- By a vote of 337 to 185, the British Parliament defeated a Conservative motion demanding rejection of the June 1948 deadline for withdrawal from India.
- Born: Kiki Dee, singer, in Little Horton, West Riding of Yorkshire, England; Dick Fosbury, Olympic gold medalist high jumper, in Portland, Oregon (d. 2023); Teru Miyamoto, author, in Kobe, Japan; Rob Reiner, actor, filmmaker and activist, in the Bronx, New York

== March 7, 1947 (Friday) ==
- Fugitive French politician Raphaël Alibert was sentenced in absentia to death for collaborating with the enemy during the war.
- Timeline of first images of Earth from space: First panorama of Earth from outer space.
- Born: Walter Röhrl, race car driver, in Regensburg, Germany; Jane Relf, singer, in Richmond, Surrey, England

== March 8, 1947 (Saturday) ==
- The Austrian Interior Ministry announced that a large underground Nazi movement had been broken up with 57 arrests made.
- The American college basketball tradition of the cutting down of the nets by the national championship team began when NC State coach Everett Scott decided he wanted a souvenir after his team won the Southern Conference men's basketball tournament. The players lifted Case on their shoulders and he cut the net down.
- Born: Michael S. Hart, author and inventor of the e-book, in Tacoma, Washington (d. 2011)

== March 9, 1947 (Sunday) ==
- Died: Carrie Chapman Catt, 88, American women's suffrage leader

== March 10, 1947 (Monday) ==
- Philippine President Manuel Roxas survived an assassination attempt when a barber from Manila tried to kill him with a hand grenade. Although he failed, a bystander was killed.
- A Big Four Conference began in Moscow with the foreign ministers of the UK, United States, France and the USSR to decide on terms for treaties with Germany and Austria.
- Japanese general Hisao Tani was sentenced to death for his role in facilitating the Nanking Massacre.
- 1947 Thames flood: Warmer temperatures in Britain caused a quick thaw resulting in widespread flooding.
- Enrique Hertzog became 49th President of Bolivia.
- Born: Kim Campbell, 19th Prime Minister of Canada, in Port Alberni, British Columbia, Canada; Tom Scholz, rock musician and founder of the band Boston, in Ottawa Hills, Ohio
- Died: Harukichi Hyakutake, 58, Japanese general

== March 11, 1947 (Tuesday) ==
- During a hearing before the House Labor Committee, US Secretary of Labor Lewis B. Schwellenbach suggested that the Communist Party be outlawed in the United States, explaining that he could see no reason why they should be allowed to run for office when their purpose "is to destroy this Government."
- The Council of States in the US zone of Germany approved a restitution law that would return identifiable property to all racial, religious and political victims of Nazi Germany.
- BBC Television resumed broadcasting after a one-month shutdown due to the energy crisis, although it was initially restricted to evening hours only and would not resume full service until April 18.
- Born: Geoff Hunt, squash player, in Melbourne, Australia
- Died: Victor Lustig, 57, Austrian-born con artist

== March 12, 1947 (Wednesday) ==
- US President Harry S. Truman announced the Truman Doctrine, telling Congress that "it must be the policy of the United States to support free people who are resisting attempted subjugation by armed minorities or by outside pressures."
- The Jewish refugee ship Shabtai Luzinsky ran the British blockade of the Palestine coast and beached north of Gaza undetected. Hundreds of local residents came down to the beach to mingle with the refugees, and were arrested by mistake while many of the 823 passengers were able to evade arrest.
- Born: Kalervo Palsa, artist, in Kittilä, Finland (d. 1987); Mitt Romney, businessman, politician and 2012 Republican Party nominee for President of the United States, in Detroit, Michigan
- Died: Walter Samuel Goodland, 84, American politician and 31st Governor of Wisconsin; Taixu, 56 or 57, Chinese Buddhist modernist, activist and thinker

== March 13, 1947 (Thursday) ==
- Turkish Prime Minister Recep Peker hailed President Truman's landmark speech as inspired by a "point of view both fully realistic and fully humanitarian."
- The British government announced a ban on midweek sports in an effort to boost worker productivity.
- The 19th Academy Awards ceremony was held at the Shrine Auditorium in Los Angeles. The Best Years of Our Lives won seven Oscars, including Best Picture.
- The stage musical Brigadoon by Alan Jay Lerner and Frederick Loewe premiered at the Ziegfeld Theatre on Broadway.
- Born: Beat Richner, paediatrician and cellist, in Switzerland (d. 2018)

== March 14, 1947 (Friday) ==
- The United States and the Philippines signed a treaty in Manila guaranteeing US military bases in the islands for 99 years.
- An Air France Douglas DC-3 en route from Lyon to Nice crashed into a mountain 25 miles south of Grenoble, France in bad weather. All 23 aboard were killed.
- Born: Pam Ayres, poet, comedian and presenter of radio and television programmes, in Stanford in the Vale, Berkshire, England

== March 15, 1947 (Saturday) ==
- Sweden reimposed rationing of coffee, tea and cocoa.
- Air Algérie was founded.
- "Heartaches" by Ted Weems and His Orchestra topped the Billboard Best Sellers in Stores record chart.
- Born: Ry Cooder, guitarist, film score composer and record producer, in Los Angeles, California

== March 16, 1947 (Sunday) ==
- During the wettest March in 300 years, dykes in East Anglia were breached in a gale, resulting in widespread flooding.
- The Paris newspaper strike ended after a month when the striking printers agreed to return to work on the same terms as before the strike.
- Margaret Truman, daughter of the president, made her radio debut as a singer with the Detroit Symphony Orchestra. An estimated 13 million people tuned in to the broadcast.
- Born: Baek Yoon-sik, actor, in Seoul, South Korea; Ramzan Paskayev, accordionist and folk musician, in Taraz, Kazakh SSR, Soviet Union

== March 17, 1947 (Monday) ==
- At the Moscow Conference, Soviet Foreign Minister Vyacheslav Molotov demanded that Germany be made to pay $10 billion in war reparations over a 20-year period. The United States and Britain opposed the idea.
- The US Supreme Court upheld the right of the Civil Service Commission to fire communists and communist sympathizers from the government.
- Born: Yury Chernavsky, record producer, composer and songwriter, in Tambov, USSR (d. 2025)

== March 18, 1947 (Tuesday) ==
- TASS published the text of a secret agreement made at the Yalta Conference in 1945 on the matter of German reparations, in order to back up Molotov's demand for them. The question then turned to whether the Yalta text was supplemented or superseded by the Potsdam Agreement.
- Italy and Yugoslavia restored diplomatic relations.
- Ireland passed the Customs-Free Airport Act, making Shannon Airport the first duty free port in the world, starting April 21.
- US patent #2417786 was granted to Hurley Smith for the pocket protector.
- Born: Tamara Griesser Pečar, historian, in Ljubljana, SFR Yugoslavia
- Died: William C. Durant, 85, American automotive pioneer; Willem Pijper, 52, Dutch composer and music critic

== March 19, 1947 (Wednesday) ==
- The Battle of Yan'an was fought as part of the Chinese Civil War, resulting in Nationalist victory.
- Herman Talmadge's claim to the governorship of Georgia was rejected by the state supreme court, which confirmed Melvin E. Thompson to be the rightful acting governor.
- The romantic comedy film My Favorite Brunette starring Bob Hope and Dorothy Lamour was released.
- Born: Glenn Close, actress, in Greenwich, Connecticut
- Died: Prudence Heward, 50, Canadian painter

== March 20, 1947 (Thursday) ==
- John Zevgos, former Communist minister of agriculture in the Greek government, was gunned down as he stood on a busy street corner in Thessaloniki. The assassin was identified as Christos Panu, who told the police he was a member of the Organization for the Protection of the People's Struggle (OPLA) and that his motive was revenge because Zevgos had told him to go to a Yugoslav camp, where he was imprisoned for six months because he did not accept "the communist line against Greece."
- Born: John Boswell, historian and Yale University professor, in Boston, Massachusetts (d. 1994)
- Died: Victor Goldschmidt, 59, Swiss geochemist; Heinrich Schwarz, 40, German SS officer and concentration camp commandant (executed by firing squad for war crimes)

== March 21, 1947 (Friday) ==
- At the Dachau trials, General Jürgen Stroop and twelve others were sentenced to death for murdering prisoners of war.
- US Congress passed the Twenty-second Amendment to the United States Constitution, setting a term limit for election and overall time of service to the office of President. The proposed amendment would be ratified on February 27, 1951.
- Police in Harlem were called to a brownstone at 2078 Fifth Avenue after receiving a telephone call reporting that there was a dead man inside. The result was the discovery of one of the most notorious cases of compulsive hoarding in history, that of the Collyer brothers. Finding the front entrance blocked by a solid wall of boxes and debris, police used a ladder to enter a second-storey room where they found the emaciated, dehydrated body of former lawyer Homer Collyer. The remains of his younger brother Langley were only eight feet away but would not be found until April 8. Over 100 tons of debris would be removed from the Collyer home, which was demolished as unsafe within the year.
- The romantic comedy film The Egg and I starring Claudette Colbert and Fred MacMurray premiered in Los Angeles.

== March 22, 1947 (Saturday) ==
- President Truman signed Executive Order 9835, requiring all federal employees to swear allegiance to the United States.
- Born: James Patterson, author, in Newburgh, New York; Florence Warner, singer, in Atlanta, Georgia

== March 23, 1947 (Sunday) ==
- The Zionist paramilitary organization Irgun urged Jews around the world to boycott British goods "as part of our fight against imperialism."
- Died: Archduchess Louise of Austria, 76

== March 24, 1947 (Monday) ==
- The House Un-American Activities Committee began hearings in Washington on a bill to outlaw the Communist Party.
- Born: Louise Lanctôt, political activist and convicted kidnapper, in Montreal, Canada; Alan Sugar, business magnate, media personality and political advisor, in Hackney, East London, England
- Died: John H. Outland, 76, American football player, coach and namesake of the Outland Trophy

== March 25, 1947 (Tuesday) ==
- A mine explosion killed 111 people in the Centralia mine disaster in Centralia, Illinois.
- Born: Elton John, pianist, singer-songwriter and composer, in Pinner, Middlesex, England
- Died: Tan Ting-pho, 52, Taiwanese painter

== March 26, 1947 (Wednesday) ==
- J. Edgar Hoover told the House Un-American Activities Committee that communists had infiltrated the American film industry and were getting their "message" out to theater audiences.
- Meat rationing ended in Canada.

== March 27, 1947 (Thursday) ==
- MPAA President Eric Johnston testified for an hour before the House Un-American Activities Committee. He denied repeatedly that American movies were being used by communists to spread propaganda and rejected as impossible a suggestion that all actors and writers suspected of communist sympathies be fired from the industry.
- Born: Walt Mossberg, journalist, in Warwick, Rhode Island

== March 28, 1947 (Friday) ==
- A French court sentenced Admiral Jean de Laborde to death for scuttling the French fleet in Toulon in 1942 rather than allowing it to fall into the hands of the Allies.
- Died: Johnny Evers, 65, American baseball player; Karol Świerczewski, 50, Polish military leader (died of wounds from an ambush by a unit of the Ukrainian Insurgent Army)

== March 29, 1947 (Saturday) ==
- The Malagasy Uprising began against French colonial rule in Madagascar.
- The 1947 Grand National horse race was won by Caughoo, a 100-to-1 outsider.
- Cambridge won the 93rd Boat Race.
- Born: Bobby Kimball, rock singer (Toto), in Orange, Texas

== March 30, 1947 (Sunday) ==
- In Bombay, new violence between Hindus and Muslims broke out over the partition of India.

== March 31, 1947 (Monday) ==
- A curfew was imposed in Bombay after 47 had been killed in rioting.
- Francisco Franco announced in a broadcast from Madrid that he had presented a bill to the Spanish Cortes providing for a new monarch to succeed him in the event of his death or incapacitation. The person would have to be of Royal blood, at least 30 years of age, a Spaniard and a Catholic, and would require the approval of two-thirds of the Cortes in a vote. If no one met the requirements a regent could be proposed.
- The Bishop of London blamed Britain's high divorce rate on the influence of American movies. In an article for the British medical magazine The Practitioner, Dr. J. C. Wand wrote that Hollywood teaches that love is an "overwhelming impulse without rhyme or reason, which must at all costs be obeyed even if it implies stealing someone else's husband or someone else's fiance."
- Born: César Gaviria, 28th President of Colombia, in Pereira, Colombia; Eliyahu M. Goldratt, physicist and business theorist, in Mandatory Palestine (d. 2011)
