= Doc Kuhn =

Doc Kuhn may refer to:

- Charles Harris "Doc" Kuhn (1892–1989), cartoonist best known as the creator of the comic strip Grandma
- Oliver Wall "Doc" Kuhn (1898–1968), American football, baseball, and basketball player for Vanderbilt University
