= MS Express Samina =

Greek ferry which sank off the coast of Paros Island (2000)

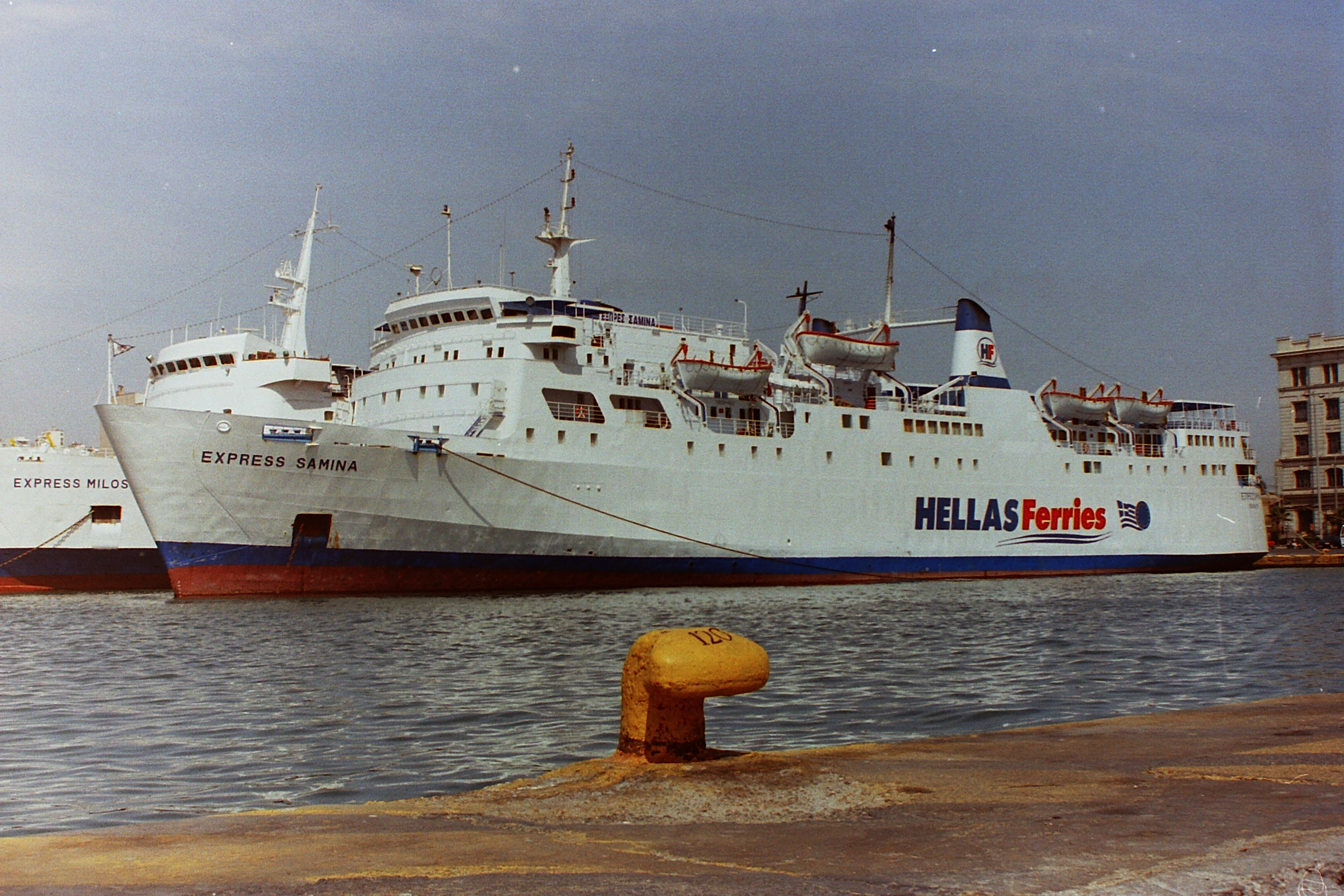
- Express Samina at Piraeus in July 2000.

History
- Name: 1966–1982: Corse; 1982–1999: Golden Vergina; 1999–2000: Express Samina
- Owner: 1966–1969: Compagnie Generale Transatlantique; 1969–1976: Compagnie Generale Transmediterraneenne; 1976–1982: SNCM; 1982–1988: Stability Maritime; 1988–1999: Agapitos Lines; 1999–2000: Minoan Flying Dolphins
- Operator: 1966–1969: Compagnie Generale Transatlantique; 1969–1976: Compagnie Generale Transmediterraneenne; 1976–1982: SNCM; 1982–1999: Agapitos Lines; 1999–2000: Minoan Flying Dolphins
- Port of registry: 1966–1982: Marseille,France; 1982–2000: Piraeus,Greece
- Builder: Chantiers de l'Atlantique, St Nazaire, France
- Yard number: F23
- Launched: 22 January 1966
- Completed: 1966
- Maiden voyage: 1966
- In service: 25 June 1966
- Out of service: 26 September 2000
- Identification: IMO number: 6613548
- Fate: Hit rocks and sank off the coast of Paros island, 26 September 2000
- Notes: Sister ship to Naias II

General characteristics
- Tonnage: 4,455 GRT; 4,555 GT; 1,099 DWT
- Length: 115.00 m (377 ft 4 in)
- Beam: 18.11 m (59 ft 5 in)
- Draught: 4.36 m (14 ft 4 in)
- Decks: 11
- Installed power: 2 × Atlantique–Pielstick 16c (10,945 kW)
- Speed: 21 knots (39 km/h; 24 mph)
- Capacity: 1,500 passengers; 170 cars

MS Express Samina (Greek: Εξπρές Σάμινα) was a French-built RoPax ferry that struck the charted Portes Islets rocks in the Bay of Parikia off the coast of Paros island in the central Aegean Sea on 26 September 2000. The accident resulted in 81 deaths and the loss of the ship. The cause of the accident was crew negligence, for which several members were found criminally liable.

== Ship history ==
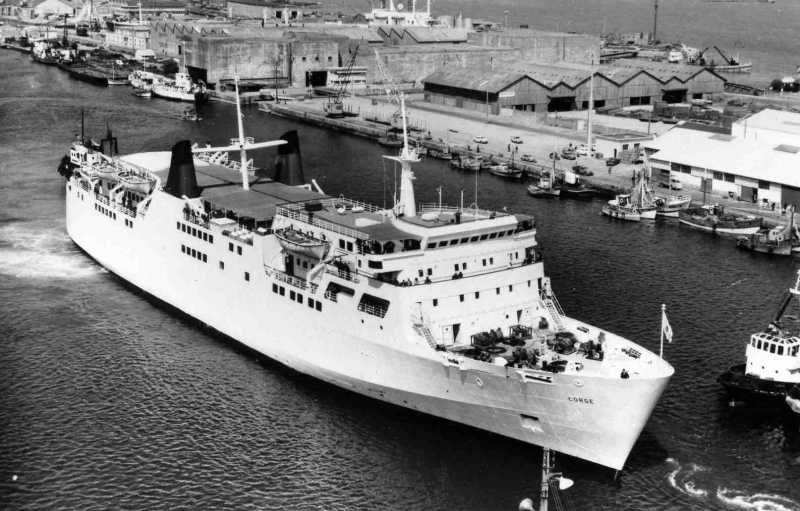
Corse in 1966

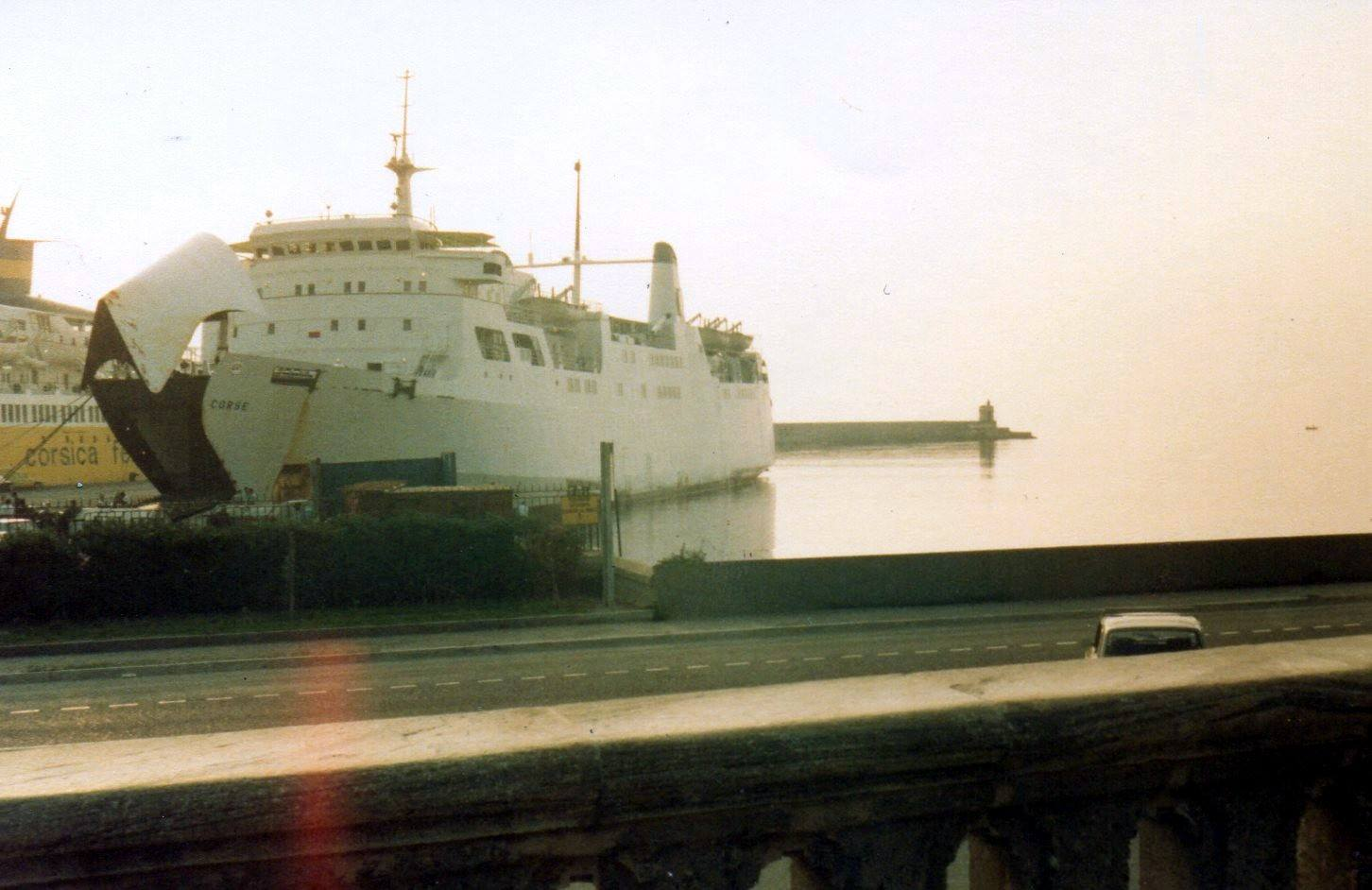
Corse on 10 June 1980

The ship was built as MS Corse in 1966 at Chantiers de l'Atlantique, St Nazaire, France for Compagnie Générale Transatlantique, along with her sister ship MS Comte De Nice. In 1969, she was transferred to Compagnie Générale Transméditerranéenne. After six years of service, the company changed its name again, to SNCM, to which she was transferred. She sailed from France for the last time in 1982, as she was sold to a Greek company, Stability Maritime, to operate their Italy–Greece–Israel route under her new name MS Golden Vergina. In 1988, she was sold to the Agapitos Bros for service in the Aegean Sea under Agapitos Lines, without a name change. She was then sold in 1999 to Minoan Flying Dolphins, again for service in the Aegean, when she was renamed Express Samina.

== Disaster ==
On the evening of Tuesday 26 September 2000, MS Express Samina left the Port of Piraeus with 473 passengers and 61 crew members. At 22:12 EEST (19:12 UTC), 2 nautical miles (4 km; 2 mi) off the port of Parikia, Paros, the ship hit the reef of Portes islets at 18 knots (33 km/h; 21 mph). The wind at the time was 8 knots (4.1 m/s; 15 km/h; 9.2 mph), force 3 on the Beaufort scale. The ship sank close to the islets at 23:02, resulting in the deaths of 80 people from a total of 533 on board. The disaster resulted in two further deaths: on the night of the sinking, the port officer on duty died of a heart attack, and a few weeks later the CEO of the shipping company committed suicide.

Collision course of MS Express Samina

The first responders to the distress call were fishing boats from the nearby port, followed by the port authorities and Royal Navy vessels, which were in the area carrying out a NATO exercise. The fact that some of the crew did not help the passengers evacuate the sinking ferry contributed to the death toll.

The crew had placed the ship on autopilot, and there were no crew members watching the ship. Even with autopilot on, standard practice calls for one crew member to watch the controls, for example to avoid collisions with other vessels. The crew had deployed the fin stabilizers system to decrease the motions in bad weather; normally both stabilizer fins would deploy, but in this case the port stabilizer fin failed to extend, causing the ship to drift and therefore not travel in a straight line. A crew member discovered the problem and tried to steer the ship to port, but this action occurred too late and at 22:12 local time (19:12 UTC), the ship struck the east face of the taller Portes pinnacle. The rocks tore a 6-metre-long (20 ft) and 1-metre-wide (3 ft) hole above the waterline. After the impact, the rocks bent the stabilizer fin backwards, and the fin cut through the side of the hull, below the waterline and next to the engine room. The water from the 3-metre (10 ft) gash destroyed the main generators and cut off electrical power. The water spread beyond the engine room, and the operators could not shut the doors remotely because of a loss of electrical power.

Professor David Molyneux, an expert in the performance of ships in harsh environments, said that the damage sustained by the MS Express Samina should not normally sink such a ship. The ship sank because nine of her eleven watertight compartment doors were open, even though safety laws require ship operators to close and lock the safety doors. Molyneux described the open watertight doors as the most significant aspect of the sinking. This conclusion was supported by an in-depth study carried out by the Ship Design Laboratory – National Technical University of Athens, a summary of which was presented at the 8th International Conference on the Stability of Ships and Ocean Vehicles.

== Chronology of the sinking ==
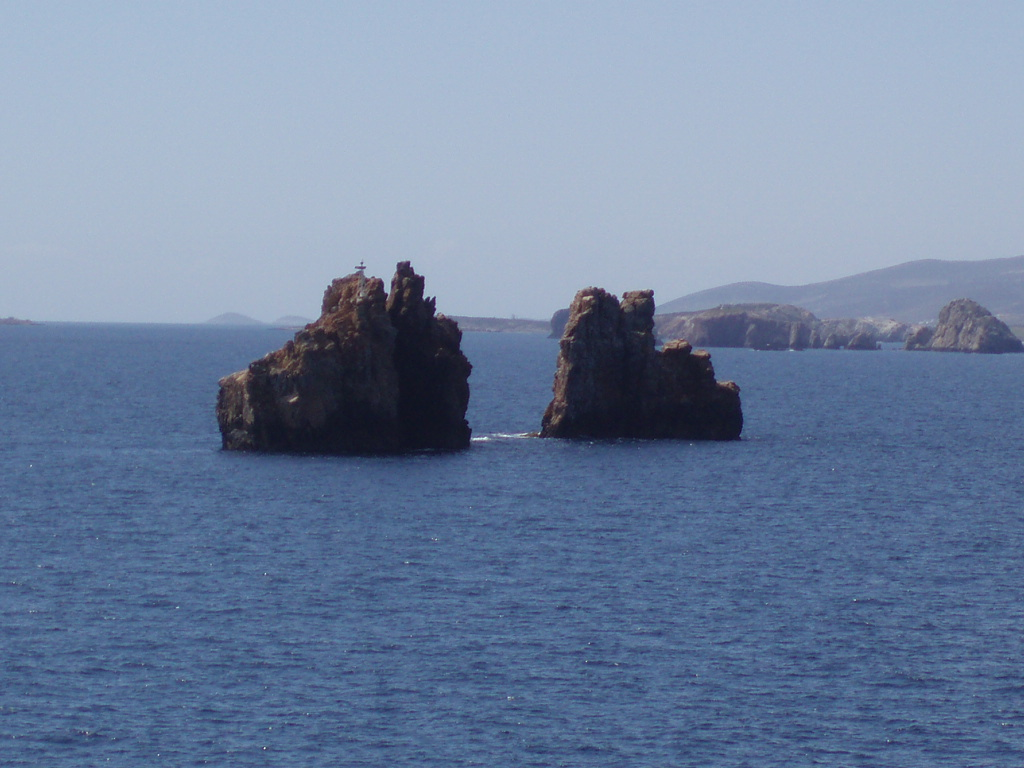
The Portes islets off the bay of Parikia, with which the ship collided

At 22:15 EEST (19:15 UTC), three minutes after impact, the Express Samina was listing by five degrees to starboard. By 22:25, the list had increased to fourteen degrees, and water began to enter the ship through the six-metre gash. By 22:29, she was listing by twenty-three degrees, preventing the launching of additional lifeboats; only three of the eight lifeboats were deployed. At 22:32 she had listed by 33 degrees, and by 22:50 the ship came to lay on her side. The clock on the bridge stopped at 23:02, which the authorities took to be an indication of the time at which the ship sank. In addition to the main cause of the sinking (open watertight doors), other contributing factors were the degree of damage, the scenario, and the open vehicle deck space in RORO ferry design.

== Aftermath ==
The port-master of Parikia, Dimitris Malamas, died the same night from a heart attack due to the stress of the evacuation operations.

As a result of the sinking, ferries were retired after 30 years instead of 35, under Greece's new laws precipitated by the disaster. These laws were eventually relaxed because of the ageing Greek fleet, but ships over 30 years old must comply with strict safety standards, and regular inspections are carried out by authorities. Additionally, this hastened the adoption of voyage recorders, the equivalent of black boxes for ships; all passenger ferries are now required by law to contain voyage recorders.

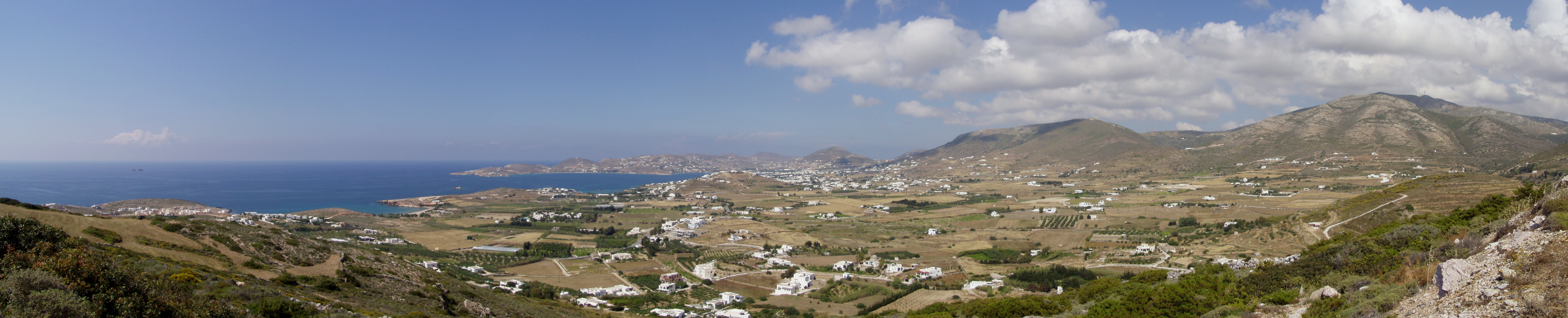
Panoramic view over the bay of Parikia, with the Portes islets visible to the left (just below the horizon)

On 29 November 2000, Pandelis Sfinias (Παντελής Σφηνιάς) the manager of the company Minoan Flying Dolphins, committed suicide by jumping from his sixth-floor office window. He had been charged with criminal negligence in conjunction with this ferry disaster and had been the focus of much media attention. A subsequent coroner's report revealed alcohol and antidepressants in his system at the time of his death. There was no note, but media reports hinted at a possible call made before he jumped. Several crew members, as well as representatives for the owners, were subsequently charged with various criminal offences, including manslaughter and negligence. The trial commenced in late July 2005.

First officer Tassos Psychoyios was sentenced to 19 years, while Captain Vassilis Giannakis received a 16-year sentence. Psychoyios had been watching a football match on television when the ship hit the rocks, according to witnesses. Three crew members were sentenced to between 15 months and 8 years 9 months for a series of misdemeanours which included abandoning ship without the captain's permission.

The City of Seattle honoured 26-year-old Heidi Hart and 32-year-old Christine Shannon, two American passengers, for heroism during the disaster. The women had rescued two men.

In the European Union, rights to cabotage in newly admitted member states – in particular, Greece, Spain and Portugal – were restricted, but this introductory provision was abandoned after criticism in the light of the Paros ferry disaster.

== In popular culture ==
The disaster was featured in "Collision Course", a Season 3 (2005) Crash Scene Investigation episode of the Canadian TV series Mayday, as well as the third episode of the first season of I Survived....

== See also ==
- List of RORO vessel accidents
- SS Heimara – passenger steamer that sank in the Aegean Sea in 1947
- SS Heraklion – car ferry that sank in the Aegean Sea in 1966
- MS Sea Diamond – cruise ship that sank off the coast of Santorini in 2007
- Costa Concordia disaster – 2012 cruise ship sinking off the Italian coast
