= February 1947 =

Month of 1947

<<	February 1947					>>
Su	Mo	Tu	We	Th	Fr	Sa
						1
2	3	4	5	6	7	8
9	10	11	12	13	14	15
16	17	18	19	20	21	22
23	24	25	26	27	28

The following events occurred in February 1947:

== February 1, 1947 (Saturday) ==
- A Douglas DC-3 crashed in the Sintra Mountains near Lisbon, Portugal during approach in poor weather conditions, killing 15 of 16 aboard. That same day another DC-3 crashed in northern Iceland in poor weather, killing all 25 aboard.
- Born: Jessica Savitch, television news presenter and correspondent, in Kennett Square, Pennsylvania (d. 1983)

== February 2, 1947 (Sunday) ==
- General elections were held in Nicaragua to elect a president and parliament. Leonardo Argüello Barreto was elected amongst widespread voting irregularities.
- Carlo Sforza replaced Pietro Nenni as Italian Minister of Foreign Affairs.
- Lydia Bailey by Kenneth Roberts topped The New York Times Fiction Best Sellers list.
- Born: Farrah Fawcett, actress and artist, in Corpus Christi, Texas (d. 2009)

== February 3, 1947 (Monday) ==
- The US Supreme Court decided De Meerleer v. Michigan, ordering a new trial for Rene de Meerleer, who as a 17-year old in 1932 received a life sentence for murder following a one-day trial without a lawyer.
- The coldest temperature ever recorded in continental North America was registered in Snag, Yukon: −63.0 °C (−81.4 °F).
- Born: Paul Auster, author, in Newark, New Jersey; Melanie Safka, singer-songwriter, in Astoria, Queens, New York (d. 2024)
- Died: Petar Živković, 68, Serbian soldier and 11th Prime Minister of Yugoslavia

== February 4, 1947 (Tuesday) ==
- Franz von Papen was arrested in the middle of his denazification trial in Nuremberg and charged with falsifying Paul von Hindenburg's will.
- German-born Communist Gerhart Eisler was arrested at his home in New York by US Marshals and sent to Ellis Island for detention as an enemy alien.
- Born: Dennis C. Blair, United States Navy admiral and 3rd Director of National Intelligence, in Kittery, Maine; Dan Quayle, 44th Vice President of the United States, in Indianapolis, Indiana

== February 5, 1947 (Wednesday) ==
- Bolesław Bierut became President of Poland.
- Rear Admiral Richard E. Byrd announced that recent aerial observations of Marie Byrd Land in Antarctica would require that maps of the continent be revised. The Walgreen Coast was found to have been previously drawn too far north, and the Kohler Range was relocated to lie along what appeared to be a great peninsula, following the discovery of a large bay in the vicinity. These findings revealed the amount of land in the region to be smaller than had previously been thought.
- Born: Darrell Waltrip, race car driver and broadcaster, in Owensboro, Kentucky

== February 6, 1947 (Thursday) ==
- At the Nanjing War Crimes Tribunal, Japanese general Hisao Tani was found guilty of facilitating the Nanking Massacre.
- German politician Gerhart Eisler was brought before the House Un-American Activities Committee in Washington and charged with conspiracy to overthrow the US government, among other charges. He refused to testify.
- Józef Cyrankiewicz became Prime Minister of Poland.
- Died: Oliver Max Gardner, 64, American politician; Luigi Russolo, 63, Italian Futurist painter and composer; Ellen Wilkinson, 55, British Labour Party politician (heart failure)

== February 7, 1947 (Friday) ==
- The New York State Athletic Commission revoked Rocky Graziano's boxing license for failing to report two $100,000 bribe offers.
- The Joy Theater opened on Canal Street in New Orleans, Louisiana.
- Born: Wayne Allwine, voice actor who provided the voice of Mickey Mouse from 1977 to 2009, in Glendale, California (d. 2009)
- Died: John Walter Bratton, 80, American Tin Pan Alley composer and theatrical producer

== February 8, 1947 (Saturday) ==
- The Karlslust dance hall fire killed at least 80 people in the Hakenfelde locality of Berlin.
- KSD-TV went on the air in St. Louis. It was the first television station in Missouri and the second located west of the Mississippi River.
- Died:St.Josephine Bakhita patron saint of Sudan, 78

== February 9, 1947 (Sunday) ==
- The dilapidated wooden brigantine Lanegev carrying 647 Jewish refugees was captured by the British destroyer HMS Chieftain following a battle off the Palestine coast south of Caesarea. The refugees threw bottles and iron bars at the British sailors, who used tear gas bombs to subdue the crowd. One refugee later died in hospital. The Jewish refugees were herded aboard the transport Empire Heywood and taken to Cyprus.
- Died: William Montagu, 9th Duke of Manchester, 69

== February 10, 1947 (Monday) ==
- The Paris Peace Treaties were signed, formally ending World War II between the Allies and Germany's Axis partners. War reparations, commitment to minority rights and territorial adjustments were among the matters settled.
- A series of drastic measures went into effect in Britain aimed at stretching the country's dwindling coal supplies as far as possible. In the London, Midlands and North West regions, household electricity was shut off for five hours each day, while electricity to industries was shut off completely. All forms of commercial lighting such as illuminated advertising was banned, and BBC Radio signed off at 11 p.m. each night while BBC Television suspended broadcasting entirely.
- The Free Territory of Trieste was established.
- The United States Supreme Court decided Everson v. Board of Education, a landmark ruling which applied the Establishment Clause in the country's Bill of Rights to State law.
- Born: Louise Arbour, lawyer, prosecutor and jurist, in Montreal, Canada; Nicholas Owen, journalist and newsreader, in London, England

== February 11, 1947 (Tuesday) ==
- A representative of the Chinese government announced that President Chiang Kai-shek had ordered drastic economic measures to combat runaway inflation and black market transactions. The Chinese yuan had collapsed to 17,500 to 1 American dollar due to heavy government deficits stemming from the strain of the ongoing Civil War.
- George Tomlinson became the new UK Minister of Education following Ellen Wilkinson's death in office.
- Born: Yukio Hatoyama, Prime Minister of Japan from 2009 to 2010, in Bunkyō, Tokyo; Derek Shulman, musician and record executive, in The Gorbals, Glasgow, Scotland
- Died: Martin Klein, 63, Estonian wrestler and silver medalist at the 1912 Summer Olympics; Ernest Terah Hooley, 88, English financial promoter and fraudster

== February 12, 1947 (Wednesday) ==
- The Panglong Agreement was reached between the Burmese Government and the Shan, Kachin and Chin peoples.
- Britain recognized the communist government of Bulgaria.
- Christian Dior presented his first fashion collection in Paris. It went down in fashion history as The "New Look" after Harper's Bazaar editor-in-chief Carmel Snow told Christian, "Your dresses have such a new look!"
- Died: Kurt Lewin, 56, German-American psychologist; Sidney Toler, 72, American actor, playwright and theatre director

== February 13, 1947 (Thursday) ==
- All 32 daily newspapers of Paris suspended publication when members of the mechanical trade unions joined in a strike of administrative employees.
- The radio anthology show Family Theater premiered on the Mutual Broadcasting System in the United States. The series ran until 1957.
- The Wolfgang Borchert play The Man Outside made its debut on German radio.
- Born: Mike Krzyzewski, college basketball coach, in Chicago, Illinois

== February 14, 1947 (Friday) ==
- British Foreign Secretary Ernest Bevin announced that Britain had given up trying to solve the Palestine problem and would put the issue before the United Nations.
- Paris was virtually shut down for four hours when police, public utility workers and other government employees participated in a token strike to protest the French government's refusal to grant a general wage increase.

== February 15, 1947 (Saturday) ==
- 1947 Avianca Douglas DC-4 crash: An Avianca Douglas DC-4 crashed into Mt. El Tablazo near Bogotá, Colombia, killing all 53 people on board.
- Chiang Kai-shek blamed the ongoing Chinese Civil War on the United States' refusal to supply his Nationalist forces with arms.
- "(I Love You) For Sentimental Reasons" by the King Cole Trio hit #1 on the Billboard Best Sellers in Stores record chart.
- Born: John Adams, composer, in Worcester, Massachusetts; Wenche Myhre, singer and actress, in Kjelsås, Oslo, Norway

== February 16, 1947 (Sunday) ==
- Chiang Kai-shek introduced a number of measures to address China's economic crisis, including the ordering home of all Chinese fortunes abroad, prohibiting dealings in gold and foreign currency and banning strikes and lockouts.
- "Coal Sunday": Many miners in Wales voluntarily gave up their traditional free Sunday and worked a full shift in an effort to ease the British coal crisis.

== February 17, 1947 (Monday) ==
- The war crimes trial of Albert Kesselring began in Venice.
- Voice of America began making radio broadcasts to the Soviet Union.
- King George VI, Queen Elizabeth and the two Princesses arrived in South Africa for an historic two-month tour, marking the first time that the reigning sovereign of England had ever visited the country.
- The World Figure Skating Championships, the first to be held since 1939, concluded in Stockholm, Sweden. Hans Gerschwiler of Switzerland won the men's competition while Barbara Ann Scott of Canada won the ladies' title. Micheline Lannoy and Pierre Baugniet of Belgium won the pairs competition.
- The last lynching in South Carolina's history occurred when a mob seized African-American man and accused murderer Willie Earle from Pickens County jail and beat, stabbed and shot him. The case drew national attention as 31 men, all white, would be arrested.

== February 18, 1947 (Tuesday) ==
- A train derailment in the Allegheny Mountains near Altoona, Pennsylvania killed 27 people and injured 105.
- French Prime Minister Paul Ramadier told the National Assembly that the policemen who participated in last Friday's strike would be punished, and also called for a law preventing such police strikes in the future.
- Born: Princess Christina of the Netherlands, at Soestdijk Palace, Baarn (d. 2019); Dennis DeYoung, singer, songwriter, keyboardist and founding member of the rock band Styx, in Chicago, Illinois; Eliot Engel, politician, in New York City (d. 2026)
- Died: Valentina Dmitryeva, 87, Russian writer, teacher, medical doctor and revolutionary

== February 19, 1947 (Wednesday) ==
- American Lieutenant General Geoffrey Keyes handed Austrian Chancellor Leopold Figl a gold brick worth $13,000 US as a token of the United States' return of $4.7 million worth of gold that had been part of the Austrian National Bank's reserve before it had been taken by the Germans following Austria's annexation.
- The docudrama film The Beginning or the End starring Brian Donlevy and Robert Walker premiered in Washington, D.C.
- Born: Gustavo Rodríguez, actor, in Ciudad Bolívar, Venezuela (d. 2014)

== February 20, 1947 (Thursday) ==
- British Prime Minister Clement Attlee announced that the government would hand over power to one or more independent Indian governments by June 1948.
- Lord Louis Mountbatten becomes Viceroy of India.
- An explosion at an electroplating plant in Los Angeles killed at least 15 people and injured 158. It was determined that a mixture of perchloric acid and acetic anhydride caused the blast.
- Some fruit flies became the first animals in space that returned alive. United States sent a V-2 rocket containing fruit flies to study the effects of radiation on living organisms and to see if the radiation from space would be a potential problem for future astronauts.
- Born: Peter Osgood, footballer, in Windsor, Berkshire, England (d. 2006); Peter Strauss, actor, in Croton-on-Hudson, New York

== February 21, 1947 (Friday) ==
- Italy and Argentina signed an agreement under which thousands of Italian workers would be permitted to emigrate to Argentina.
- Edwin H. Land, co-founder of the Polaroid Corporation, demonstrated a new type of camera that could develop a photograph in just one minute with the turn of a knob. "With the new camera, it will be possible for the amateur to make a snapshot and compare it with the scene before he leaves the spot," Land explained to a gathering of the Optical Society of America in New York. "He can ask his subject to hold the pose until he sees the result. If he is not satisfied with the expression on the subject's face or anything else, he can retake it immediately and correct the fault."
- Born: Victor Sokolov, journalist and Eastern Orthodox priest, in Tver, USSR (d. 2006)

== February 22, 1947 (Saturday) ==
- Several hundred Germans were arrested in the British and American occupation zones on suspicion of having established an underground Nazi organization.
- A radio set factory in Chicago presented the smallest radio in the world: 20 cm long and 10 cm high.
- "Open the Door, Richard" by Count Basie and His Orchestra topped the Billboard Best Sellers in Stores record chart.
- Born: Pirjo Honkasalo, film director, in Helsinki, Finland

== February 23, 1947 (Sunday) ==
- The International Organization for Standardization (ISO) was founded.
- The World Ice Hockey Championships, the first to be held since 1939, concluded in Czechoslovakia. The host country won the tournament by finishing with a 6–1 record.
- Born: George E. Curry, journalist, in Tuscaloosa, Alabama (d. 2016)

== February 24, 1947 (Monday) ==
- The Denazification Court in Nuremberg sentenced former German chancellor and diplomat Franz von Papen to eight years in a labour camp for having assisted Hitler's rise to power and associating with the Nazi regime to the end. Von Papen was also ordered to forfeit his personal fortune. On account of his advanced age, von Papen was ordered to be given special work suited to his physical capacity.
- The British government lifted the two-week ban on electric power to industrial plants in the Midlands, sending nearly 1 million men back to work. All other energy restrictions remained in effect.
- For the first time since 1939, British companies were authorized to directly deal with German businessmen for the purchase of German goods. American companies would have the same authorization starting on March 4.
- Born: Rupert Holmes, musician and author, in Northwich, Cheshire, England; Edward James Olmos, actor and director, in Los Angeles, California
- Died: Pierre Janet, 87, French psychologist, philosopher and philanthropist

== February 25, 1947 (Tuesday) ==
- Abolition of Prussia: Allied Control Council Enactment No. 46 formally dissolved the historic state of Prussia after more than four centuries of existence.
- Born: Doug Yule, musician, in Boston, Massachusetts

== February 26, 1947 (Wednesday) ==
- In Brussels, a parade of 50,000 former Belgian POWs demanding payment of bonuses promised to them during the war turned into a riot against the police, injuring as many as 100 people. Belgian Defence Minister Raoul de Fraiteur said the bonuses had not been paid because Belgium did not have the money.
- Born: Sandie Shaw, singer, in Dagenham, England
- Died: Heinrich Häberlin, 78, Swiss politician; Alexander Löhr, 61, Romanian-born Luftwaffe commander (executed by a Yugoslav firing squad for war crimes)

== February 27, 1947 (Thursday) ==
- Cuban President Ramón Grau signed a decree ordering the deportation of mobster Lucky Luciano as an undesirable.
- The February 28 Incident began in Taiwan when Chinese law enforcement killed a bystander during an argument with a woman selling untaxed cigarettes. This was the boiling over point for a populace harboring many feelings of frustration over economic problems and corruption.
- Born: Gidon Kremer, classical violinist, in Riga, Latvia, USSR

== February 28, 1947 (Friday) ==
- The Nationalist Chinese government violently suppressed the uprising in Taiwan. The number of deaths over the next few days was estimated at 10,000.
- An American P-82 fighter plane flew 4,978 miles (8,011 km) nonstop from Hickam Field in Hawaii to LaGuardia Airport in New York City in 14 hours and 33 minutes, establishing a new nonstop record for fighter craft.
- Born: Stephanie Beacham, actress, in London, England
