= Berlin Conference (1954) =

Diplomatic conference

The Berlin Conference of 1954 was a meeting of the "Big Four" foreign ministers of the United States (John Foster Dulles), Britain (Anthony Eden), France (Georges Bidault), and the Soviet Union (Vyacheslav Molotov) from 25 January to 18 February 1954.

The ministers agreed to call a wider international conference to discuss a settlement to the recent Korean War and the ongoing First Indochina War between France and the Viet Minh, but it failed to reach agreement on issues of European security and the international status of Germany and Allied-occupied Austria, then under four-power occupation after World War II. Molotov had proposed the reunification of Germany with the inclusion of an all German government, but the Western states (USA, Britain, France) dismissed this, insisting that free elections should be held before reunification.

In March 1953, Stalin had died and Khrushchev had become the new USSR leader. The meeting was an early fruit of the first period of US-Soviet détente or "thaw" during the Cold War. Little progress was made except with Austria from which the Soviets agreed to withdraw if it were made a neutral country. The Geneva Conference (April to July 1954) produced a temporary peace in Indochina and France's withdrawal from Vietnam, but formal peace in Korea remained elusive.

Some effects of the Berlin Conference were that the leaders were unable to reach an agreement. There was a "fear of freedom" between the East and the West on matters such as free elections in Germany and Austria. The Khrushchev regime was not willing to place any trust in either country. Eight weeks from the end of the conference, they began to plan the Geneva Conference.
