= March 1947 martial law in Mandatory Palestine =

Period during the Jewish insurgency in Mandatory Palestine

Martial law in Mandatory Palestine refers to the period when martial law was imposed by the British military on Jewish areas of Palestine during the Jewish insurgency in Mandatory Palestine. Statutory martial law was imposed on 2 March 1947 and enforced for 15 days in Jewish sectors of Mandatory Palestine. The crackdown was known as Operation Hippo in the greater Tel Aviv region and as Operation Elephant in the Jewish neighborhoods of Jerusalem.

In response to attacks carried out by the Zionist militant organizations Irgun and Lehi against British vehicles, installations, and personnel, the British threatened to impose martial law. The Irgun ostensibly deliberately provoked the British into declaring martial law, carrying out attacks throughout Palestine on March 1, 1947. The deadliest incident occurred at the British Officers' Club in Jerusalem which was bombed and subsequently became the site of a gunfight: twenty people were killed.

The British High Commissioner implemented martial law the following day in Jewish neighborhoods of Jerusalem and the Tel Aviv metropolitan area, the declaration affected civil services and governing. British soldiers arrested suspects throughout Palestine before martial law was lifted on 17 March. Throughout its duration, clashes between British personnel and Zionist militants continued.

== Background ==
The Bevin Plan proposed by Great Britain which foresaw a binational state with cantonal arrangements that would permit strong regional autonomy had been rejected by both sides in early 1947, with the Jewish representatives claiming all of the land with the exception of the hills of the West Bank, and asking for an influx of 100,000 Jews for the first two years, to establish a Jewish majority. Likewise the Arab delegation rejected the plan, asking only that the British leave Palestine. When warned this would lead to a bloodbath, with Bevin noting that the Jews were in a stronger military position than the Arabs, they trusted that the League of Arab States would balance the equation. (Note: "Le lendemain, la délégation sioniste exprime oralement ces revendications: la totalité du pays à l'exception des collines cisjordaniennes... Dans les jours qui suivent, une ultime négotiation a lieu. Les sionistes se montrent prêts à une continuation du mandate pour une période de dix ans avec les 100 000 immigrants pour les deux premières années, puis la capacité économique d'absorption.. Les délégations arabes rejettent les propositions britanniques. Bevin leur demande cer qu'ils attendent de la puissance mandataire. Il lui est répondu: son depart de la Palestine. Bevin les adjure de prendre en compte le rapport des forces, qui est en faveur des Juifs. Il y aura un bain de sang. Les Arabs palestiniens se montrent confiants, il sauront affronter la situation avec éventuellement l'aide de la Ligue des États arabes.") Given the impasse, Bevin left a decision in the hands of the United Nations General Assembly, in the belief that the numbers there would hinder any partition plan, and lead the parties back to the only reasonable solution, in Great Britain's view, namely that outlined in the Bevin Plan. The Zionists believed the British were stalling for time, and the Jewish Agency made efforts in the meantime to round up international assent to the establishment of a Jewish state, while multiplying facts on the ground by creating new settlements, increasing Aliyah Bet operations and leaving the dissident Jewish organisations to increase attacks against British forces.

By February 1947–in response to political unrest and the kidnappings of British officials–the British government evacuated women, children, and non-essential male civilians from Mandatory Palestine; later in the month, Britain announced its intent to terminate the Mandate, referring the matter of the future of Palestine to the United Nations. All British soldiers and policemen still stationed in the Mandate were subsequently concentrated into security zones in major cities. In a secret order on 10 February, which represented a change in tactics, the Zionist militant organization Irgun considered everyone British an enemy, no matter what position they held. The security measures led to Arab unrest in the Mandate and an increase in purchases of black market goods–an "indication of preparations for trouble".

=== Attacks that triggered the imposition of martial law ===
On 1 March, the Irgun and Lehi coordinated a wave of terrorist attacks targeting British personnel throughout the Mandate. The organizations claimed that the attacks were in response to Britain's heightened security and their referral of the Mandate to the United Nation. Eight incidents took place on the day; the militants made use of land mines, mortars, and explosives to destroy military vehicles, installations, and personnel.

The deadliest incident –perpetrated by the Irgun– targeted the Goldsmith British Officers' Club in Jerusalem. The building had living quarters in the upper floors. It was the first terrorist attack on a Saturday, the Jewish Sabbath. A Jewish girl who was the receptionist and twelve British officers were killed when militants, some wearing police uniforms, under the cover of machine gun fire raided the building, planted and detonated explosives, and subsequently engaged in a gunfight. In addition, a number of military vehicles were mined on the inter-urban roads, army depots at Hadera, Pardes Hanna, and Beit Lid came under mortar and machine gun fire, and 15 vehicles were destroyed in an attack on an army vehicle lot in Haifa. Twenty British personnel were killed and 30 wounded on that date.

== Martial law ==
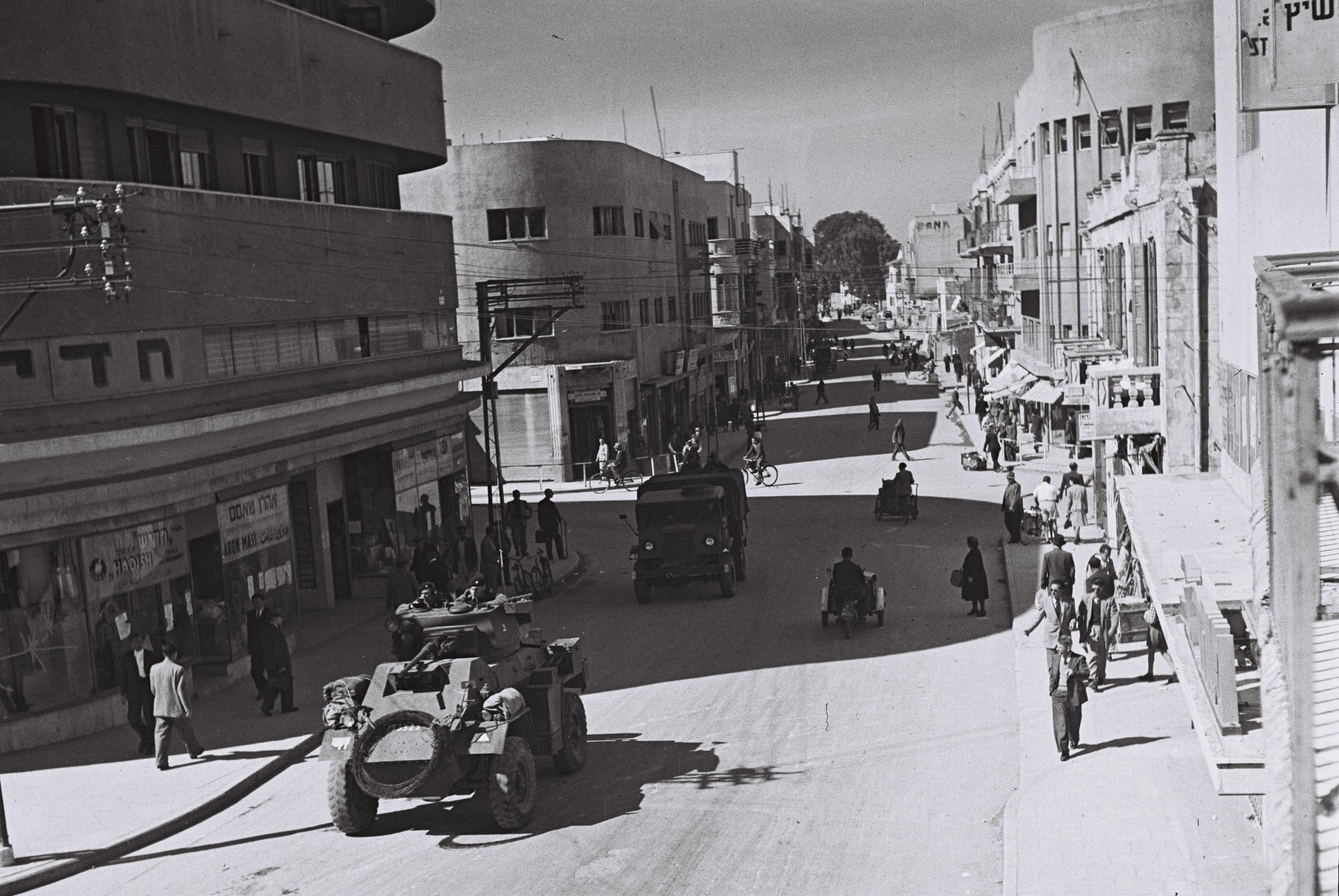
British Army vehicles patrolling Nahlat Binyamin Street in Tel Aviv during a break in the curfew

The British responded by swiftly imposing curfews. On 2 March, martial law was declared in Tel Aviv and nearby Ramat Gan, Bnei Brak, Givatayim, and Petah Tikva, the Sharon plain, and in the Jerusalem neighborhoods of Mea Shearim, Sanhedria, Kerem Avraham, Geula, and Bukhara. Searches were also carried out in Rehavia and Shaare Zedek. Martial law was imposed with the objective of pressuring the Jewish Agency which had not been cooperating in the British campaign against terrorism. Maj. Gen. Richard Gale, the military governor of Tel Aviv, reflected on the order: "Martial law shall be declared. It is not to be viewed as a punishment, although there will be no avoiding suffering caused to residents through the fault of irresponsible individuals". However, martial law was also in fact imposed as a form of collective punishment against the Yishuv over its failure to cooperate with the British against the Irgun and Lehi, as it was expected that it would cause economic pain for the civilian population and pressure it to cooperate in the suppression of insurgent activity. The intelligence officer of the 6th Airborne Division believed it would have an effect because "making of money is almost a second religion with the Jewish race." He subsequently predicted that population would be forced to "go on a manhunt to save themselves and their pockets."

On 3 March, an Irgun depot was raided in Tel Aviv, where detonators, bombs, and British military uniforms were found. Later that week, British troops shot and killed two Jews in Jerusalem, including a four-year-old girl who was standing on the porch of her home in Mea Shearim. British soldiers arrested militants throughout the Mandate. In Jerusalem, a massive manhunt was underway for the suspects in the British Officers' Club bombing. A total of 78 people suspected of terrorist activity were arrested during the martial law period, 15 identified as Lehi members, 12 as Irgun members, and the rest "connected." Despite security measures, terrorist activity continued both in and out of the security zones, resulting in the deaths of 14 British personnel and 15 civilians between 1 and 13 March.

=== Effects on the populace ===
Martial law had serious implications for the Jewish populace of the affected areas. Civil services were suspended and the power of civil leadership, including the courts system, was transferred to military governors; British soldiers were granted policing authority and movement in and out of areas under martial law required permits. Residents of the areas under martial law were under curfew for all but three hours a day. Arabs were affected too by the price of goods and the dismissal of thousands of daily wage workers. Ben-Gurion complained that the curfew was having a serious negative impact on the economy and public services, arguing that the effect risked creating sympathy for the cause of terrorism among the general population. General Sir Miles Dempsey commented on 4 March apropos the military situation stating that there were as many murders in England as in Palestine, with only one difference: "in England the murderer is caught because the people of the country are on the side of law and order and assist the police. In Palestine the people do not assist the police and the murderers are not caught."

Tel Aviv unexpectedly became a major centre of employment and adjacent communities–otherwise cut off from the city–requested they be incorporated into the boundaries of martial law. Pressure on the Jewish Agency led to it taking serious steps to distance itself from the dissident militant groups.

During the period of martial law, British troops in Jerusalem killed two Jewish civilians, including a 4-year-old girl. In Tel Aviv, British troops with orders to shoot curfew violators on sight shot at pedestrians and motorists out on legitimate business.

== Aftermath ==
The High Commissioner revoked martial law on 17 March, concluding its objectives were met and that the order was inadvertently affecting Arabs as well. The Colonial Office assessed that the operation while resulting in some Jewish collaboration with British authorities, did not result in the hoped-for level of cooperation. An estimated $10,000,000 in economic losses were reported for the Jewish community in the 15 days under martial law. The military estimate was that martial law was ineffective, -in failing to make a dint into terrorism, that they lacked the means to maintain the curfew much longer, and soldiers were being tied down in administrative duties which hampered operational readiness. Ben-Gurion characterized the dissidents' approach as terrorism, and warned that it risked plunging the Yishuv into a fratricidal struggle. On May 15, the Haganah was directed to move against the militant factions, not to hand them over to the British, but to impede their execution of further attacks, and their intervention proved effective in stopping projects of assassination and destruction of British military property. Some of those captured were put on trial and received death sentences. In reprisal for the execution of several of their members, the Irgun captured and hanged two British sergeants, leaving their bodies booby-trapped.

== See also ==
- Palestinian law

== Sources ==
- "Attack on Officers' Club". The Sidney Morning Herald. 3 March 1947 – via Trove. "Other Jewish gunmen, dressed in police uniforms, then opened fire on the front of the building."
- "Bomb Blasts Rock Haifa —Terrorist Violence Renewed— Martial Law in Palestine Cities". The Northern Miner. 3 March 1947 – via Trove. "a number of armed men surrounded the officers' club five minutes before the explosion and began shooting [...] A Jewish girl receptionist is among the dead."
- Cohen, Michael (1982). Palestine and the Great Powers, 1945-1948. Princeton University Press. ISBN 978-0691638775.
- Cohen, Michael (2012). Palestine to Israel: From Mandate to Independence. Routledge. ISBN 978-1-136-28660-5.
- "Curfew in Jerusalem, 4-year-old killed". Haaretz. 5 March 1947. p. 5.
- Ekwe-Ekwe, Herbert (2016). British Counterinsurgency, 1919–60. Springer. ISBN 978-1-349-80813-7.
- Golani, Motti (2013). Palestine: Between Politics and Terror, 1945-1947. University Press of New England. ISBN 978-1-61168-387-5.
- Grob-Fitzgibbon, Benjamin (2011). Imperial Endgame: Britain's Dirty Wars and the End of. Palgrave Macmillan. ISBN 978-0-230-30038-5.
- "Heavy Explosion in Jerusalem Fashionable Club Wrecked". The Morning Bulletin. 1 March 1947 – via Trove. "The three-storied Goldsmith Officers' Club on the fashionable King George V Avenue, Jerusalem [...] It is the first time that the terrorists acted on the Jewish Sabbath."
- "Jewish terrorists today blew up the fashionable Goldsmith Officers' Club in King George V Avenue, Jerusalem". The Sunday Telegraph. Australian Associated Press. 2 March 1947 – via Trove. "The club is British, and has living quarters for bachelor officers on the upper floors. There is a lounge, bar, and restaurant on the ground floor."
- Laurens, Henry (2002). La Question de Palestine. Vol. 2. Fayard. ISBN 978-2-213-61251-5.
- Levenberg, Haim (1993). Military Preparations of the Arab Community in Palestine, 1945-1948. Psychology Press. ISBN 0-7146-3439-5.
- "Martial Law Lifted in Palestine Today; 15-day Military Rule Cost Jews $10,000,000". Jewish Telegraphic Agency. 17 March 1947b.
- "300,000 Palestine Jews Under Martial Law; Agency Protests Sweeping Measures". Jewish Telegraphic Agency. 3 March 1947a.
- "Terroristas judeus atacaram a zona de segurança de Jerusalem". Jornal do Brasil (in Portuguese). Reuters. 3 March 1947. "Jewish terrorists, wearing police uniforms, perpetrated today [1 March] the most daring attack in Palestine since the bombing of the King David hotel"
- "the Terrorists Have British Uniforms". ABC (in Spanish). 3 March 1947. "In the Irgun munitions depot found in Tel Aviv were found [...] and British military uniforms"
