= Kavalliani =

Island in Greece

Native name: Καβαλλιανή
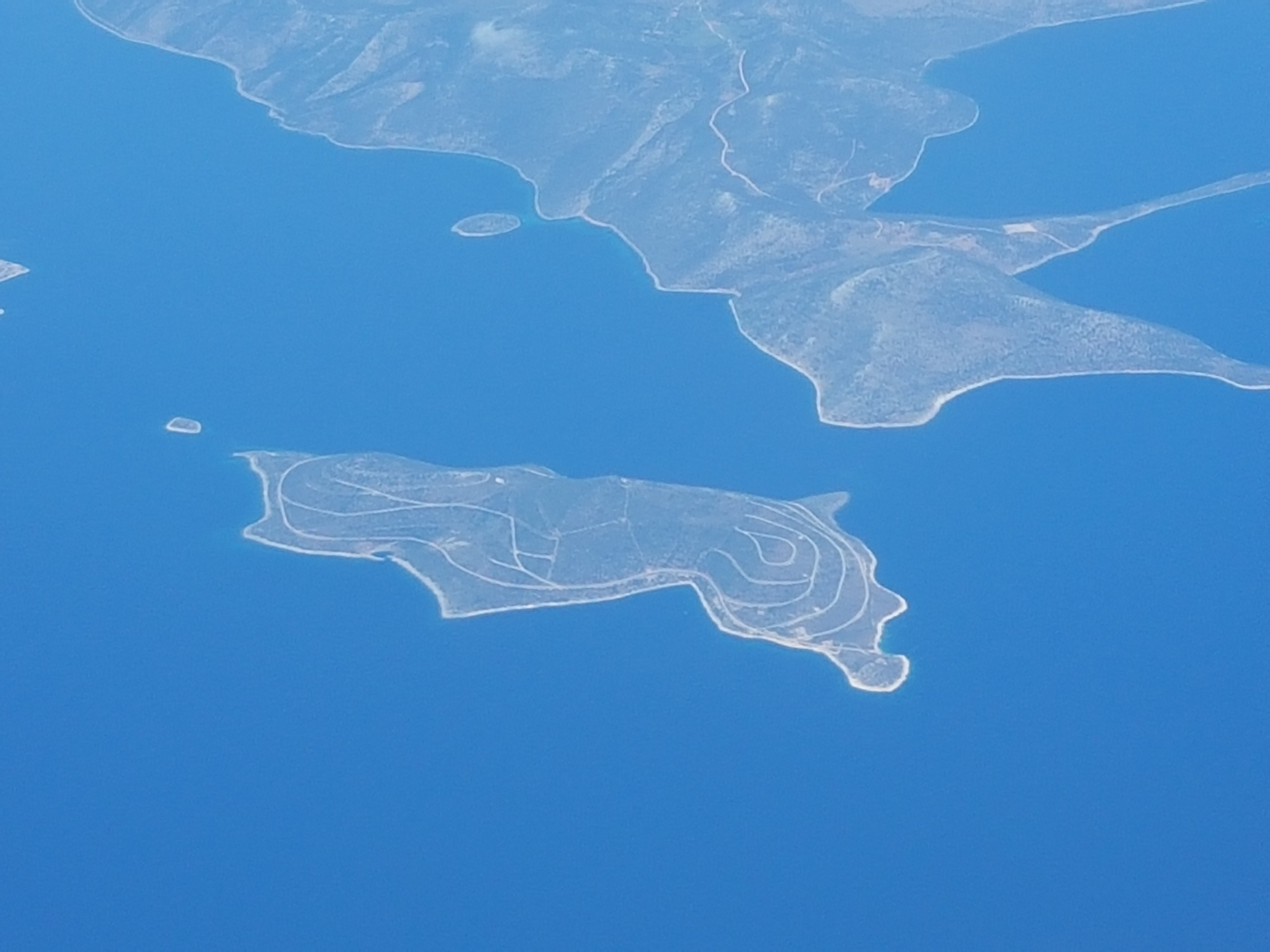

- Location within Greece

Geography
- Coordinates: 38.223°N 24.103°E
- Area: 2 km^{2} (0.77 sq mi)

Administration
- Greece
- Region: Central Greece
- Regional unit: Euboea

Demographics
- Population: 0 (2011)

Kavalliani is a small island in the South Euboean Gulf. It is located opposite of ancient Rhamnous in Attica. The island is still uninhabited although a building cooperative of Emporiki Bank is developed in the island. The island has an area about 2 km^{2}. Administratively, the island belongs to Styra municipality.

== History ==
Kavalliani is also named Andriani. In antiquity, the island was possibly the island Glaukonisos referred to by Pliny. There are several wrecks in the area, some of which ancient. The most well-known is the wreck of SS Heimara from 1947. Heimara sank few metres southwest of Kavallianni and overall 385 people drowned. It was the most deadly maritime accident in modern Greek history.
