= Grandma (comic strip) =

American comic strip by Charles Kuhn

- Charles Kuhn's Grandma (December 30, 1962)
- Author: Charles Kuhn
- Current status/schedule: Concluded
- Launch date: April 14, 1947
- Syndicate(s): Richardson Feature Service (1947–June 1948); King Features Syndicate (June 1948–1969)
- Genre: Humor

Grandma is a comic strip by Charles Kuhn that ran from April 14, 1947, to June 28, 1969. He usually signed the strip "Chas. Kuhn".

== Publication history ==
Grandma began April 14, 1947. It was originally distributed by Duke Richardson's Indianapolis-based syndicate, Richardson Feature Service. A year later, Grandma was picked up by King Features Syndicate, which distributed it from June 28, 1948, until June 28, 1969.

The Sunday page began November 20, 1949. Kuhn used it to introduce an innovative, interactive device; a single panel in the middle tier was displayed minus colors, so that young readers could use crayons to complete the coloring. It was captioned "Color this one, kids!" or "Here's one to color, kids!"

By 1952, the strip ran internationally in 240 newspapers.

== Characters and story ==
The strip depicted humorous events in the life of a friendly, fun-loving woman known to her friends and neighbors only as Grandma. As comics historian Don Markstein described the character:

Grandma was known by no other name, to children and grownups alike, despite the fact that she gave no evidence of having actual progeny of her own. Like the much earlier Lady Bountiful, she palled around day in and day out with the neighborhood kids; but unlike her, Grandma wasn't interested in improving them. She was just having fun. Otherwise, she kept busy around the house, but of course, the household chores included a lot of baking. Kuhn derived much of her character from his own mother, who, in her dotage by most standards, was always ready to dress up, sing, and even dance a jig to help out a small theatrical production put on by her friends, the children of the neighborhood.

Kuhn sometimes used Grandma to publicize Goodwill Industries in Indianapolis. He was so totally absorbed by and devoted to his strip that when he was asked about hobbies, he answered, "Grandma and creating toys for the kids." Toys belonging to the neighborhood kids were also a key topic in many Grandma strips; she sometimes reverted to a second childhood and played with the toys herself. Kuhn's other main interest was fishing.

== Awards ==
Charles Kuhn's Grandma (December 5, 1965)

At the 1958 Chicago convention of the Grandmothers Club of America, Charles and Lois Kuhn were named Foster Grandparents of the Year. In addition to a plaque from the National Grandmother and Grandfather awards committee, actress Jane Darwell presented the Kuhns with their awards: miniature gold rocking chairs with red plush seats.
