= SS Heimara =

Greek-owned passenger ship that sunk in 1947

Coordinates: 38.1864°N 24.1003°E

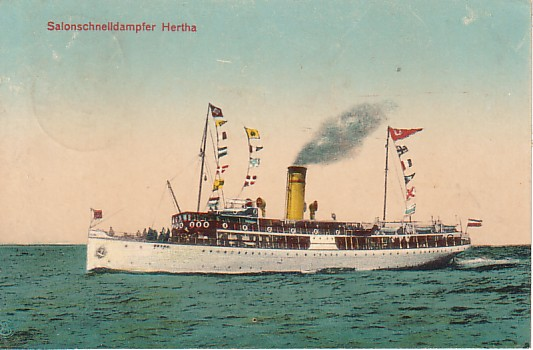
- The SS Hertha

History
- Name: Heimara (1946–47); Hertha (1905–46)
- Namesake: Himara (1946–47)
- Owner: Greek Government (1946–47); Stettiner Dampfschiffs Ges. - J. F. Brauenlich G.m.b.H. (?–?)
- Operator: Greek Government (1946–47); Stettiner Dampfschiffs Ges. - J. F. Brauenlich G.m.b.H. (?–?)
- Port of registry: (German Empire) ?? (1905-33); (Germany) ?? (1933-1945); (United Kingdom) ?? (1945–46); (Greece) Piraeus (1946–47)
- Builder: Stettiner Oderwerke
- Yard number: 547
- Completed: 1905
- Identification: code letters DALD
- Fate: Sank 19 January 1947

General characteristics
- Type: Passenger ship
- Tonnage: 1,221 GRT
- Length: 76 m (249 ft)
- Beam: 10 m (33 ft)
- Installed power: 224 NHP
- Propulsion: 2 x 3-cylinder triple-expansion engine
- Speed: 16 knots (30 km/h)
- Crew: 54

SS Heimara (sometimes spelled as Himara or Chimara, Greek: Χειμάρρα) was a passenger steamer operating the Piraeus – Thessaloniki route. The ship hit a reef and sank on 19 January 1947 in the Aegean Sea, killing around 400 people. It is Greece's deadliest maritime disaster.

== Background ==
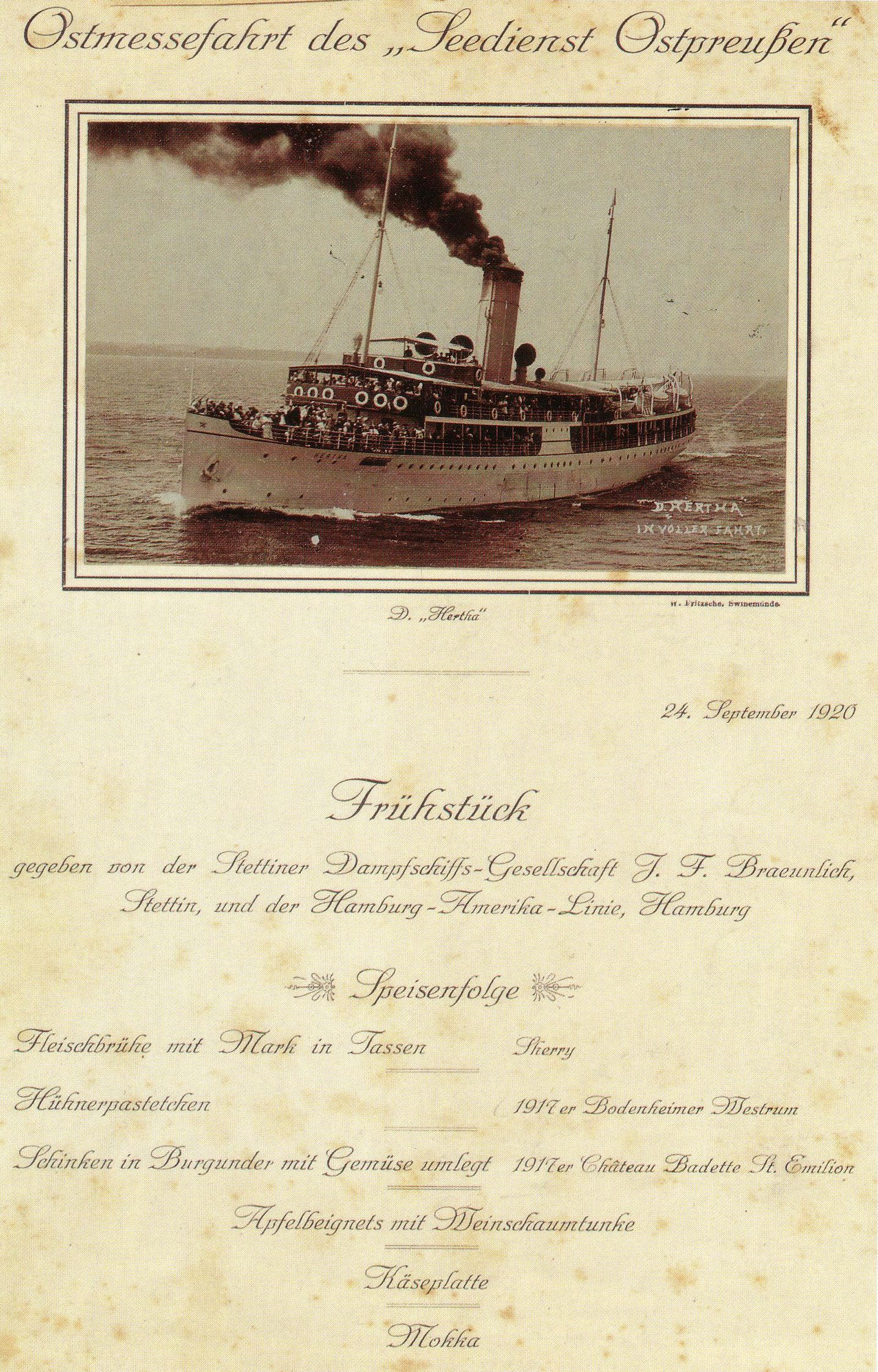
As SS Hertha, 1920

The vessel was built in 1905 as SS Hertha by Stettiner Oderwerke at Stettin, German Pomerania. She had an overall length of 250 feet (76 m), a beam of 33 ft (10 m), gross register tonnage of 1,221 tons and a top speed of 16 knots (30 km/h; 18 mph). Originally, she was used to carry mail and after 1914 as a hospital ship and a minelayer in the service of the Imperial Navy. In the summer of 1946, she was transferred to the Greek State as a German WW2 reparation and was renamed SS Heimara after Himara, a city in Albania.

== Sinking ==
On January 18, 1947, Heimara sailed from Thessaloniki bound for Piraeus with a crew of 86 and about 550 passengers. With the Greek Civil War in progress, 36 of the passengers were political prisoners being sent to exile. Due to adverse weather conditions, her captain decided to set course through the Euboean Gulf and avoid the dangerous Cape Kafireas (Cavo D' Oro) at the southeastern tip of the island of Euboea. After a stopover in Chalkida where she disembarked 10 passengers, she put to sea again at 01.30 am. Around 4:00 am of 19 January 1947, while sailing in fog in the South Euboean Gulf, the vessel hit a reef near the Verdugia (Greek: Βερδούγια) islets, which are located between Agia Marina and Nea Styra. The collision caused rudder and radio damage as well as flooding.

It took Heimara one and a half hours to sink after the accident, only one mile off the shore of Kavalliani islet. However, the panic during her disorderly abandonment, combined with the low temperatures and strong sea currents, resulted in around 400 people perishing. Several sources quote 383 victims but the exact figure is unknown as the number of those aboard was not confirmed.

== Aftermath ==
Early accounts attributed the accident to Heimara hitting a loose mine, however they were not confirmed. Investigations concluded that she had drifted several miles off course. Due to its high death toll, the accident become known as the Greek Titanic.

== See also ==
- MS Express Samina
- SS Heraklion
