= Charles Kuhn =

American cartoonist

Charles Harris Kuhn (March 20, 1892 – 1989), nicknamed Doc Kuhn, was a cartoonist best known as the creator of the comic strip Grandma. He usually signed his drawings and comic strips Chas. Kuhn.

Born in Prairie City, Illinois, he was the son of James B. and Minnie Harris Kuhn. His father ran a restaurant and proudly displayed his son's drawings in the eatery's window. At age 12, he decided to become a cartoonist when the sale of his first cartoon brought him 50 cents. Kuhn grew up in Bushnell, Illinois, and later remarked, "I hope some of the oldtimers remember me as a regular fellow."

== Cartoons and travels ==
Charles Kuhn's Grandma (May 1, 1966)

After high school, Kuhn worked in a plow factory, laboring ten hours a day, six days a week. He moved on to become a freight hustler, mill hand, steel tank worker and sign painter before enrolling at the Chicago Academy of Fine Arts (1913–14), where he studied cartooning in a class taught by Frank King. He soon landed an art job paying $10 a week. During World War I, as Kuhn put it, he "shoveled coal and chow" as a Navy fireman on the U.S.S. Connecticut. He also visited France in World War I. During the other travels of his youth, he spent time in the Canadian harvest fields and "stepped over the border into old Mexico."

Kuhn was a cartoonist with Denver's Rocky Mountain News from 1919 to 1921. He married his wife, the former Lois E. Stevens of Denver, in 1922, shortly after signing on with the Indianapolis News, filling the position left open when editorial cartoonist Gaar Williams departed to join the Chicago Tribune. Kuhn remained at the Indianapolis News as the paper's editorial cartoonist for the next 26 years. He later recalled, "My original idea was to set the world afire with my oh, so super-dandy editorial cartoons." Some of these editorial cartoons focused on the movement by Richard Lieber to establish state parks and recreational facilities in Indiana.

== Comic strip ==
Kuhn was 55 when he decided to change careers. He left editorial cartoons behind when he created Grandma, a comic strip inspired by his mother:

My mother was always full of pep and vigor. One time at 75 years of age, she dressed up in my old Navy uniform, danced a jig and played a piece on her French harp just to help the neighborhood kids put on a backyard show. My comic Grandma, in spirit at least, is my own beloved mother.

Grandma began April 14, 1947, distributed by Duke Richardson's Indianapolis-based Richardson Feature Service. A year later, the strip was picked up by King Features Syndicate which distributed it from June 28, 1948, until 1969. Kuhn was so totally absorbed by and devoted to his strip that when he was asked about hobbies, he answered, "Grandma and creating toys for the kids." Toys belonging to the neighborhood kids were also a key topic in many Grandma strips; she sometimes reverted to a second childhood and played with the toys herself. Kuhn's other main interest was fishing.

Kuhn had a regular routine that involved starting to work each morning right at 8am, followed by the arrival of an assistant at 9am. Then, as he put it, "We soon have another Grandma rolling along." Lois Kuhn was also a collaborator, as he once revealed: "She's full of Grandma ideas."

For Kuhn, who had mastered the art of drawing early in his career, humor was the key factor in creating Grandma:

To me the most important requisite in a comic strip is real down-to-earth humor. That's 90 per cent of a strip; art ability makes up the other ten per cent. And to young cartoonists, I would like to say: keep plugging. You want to be ready when that fickle old lady, Opportunity, does knock.

The Kuhns lived in Acton, Indiana until 1964 when they moved to Florida. The move enabled Kuhn to spend more time fishing. When he retired in 1969 to begin full-time fishing, Grandma came to an end.

Charles Kuhn's Grandma (September 28, 1953)

== Books ==
In a curious and unlikely pairing, the David McKay company published a book which brought together reprints of both Grandma strips and Mandrake the Magician strips. Grandma is also featured in Maurice Horn's Women in the Comics (Chelsea House, 1977).

Kuhn was the author of several art instruction books: Boy and Girl Cartoonist: A Complete Course in Cartooning, published by Saalfield Publishing Company in 1936, Kuhn Course in Cartooning; America’s Number One Cartoon Course (1944) and Doc Kuhn's Chalk Talk Tricks (Pearce Art School, Waukegan, Illinois).

== Awards ==
A cartoon from early in Charles Kuhn's career.

At the 1958 Chicago convention of the Grandmothers Club of America, Charles and Lois Kuhn were named Foster Grandparents of the Year. In addition to a plaque from the National Grandmother and Grandfather awards committee, actress Jane Darwell presented the Kuhns with their awards: miniature gold rocking chairs with red plush seats.
