= Big Four Conference =

Various conferences of leaders after World War I and World War II

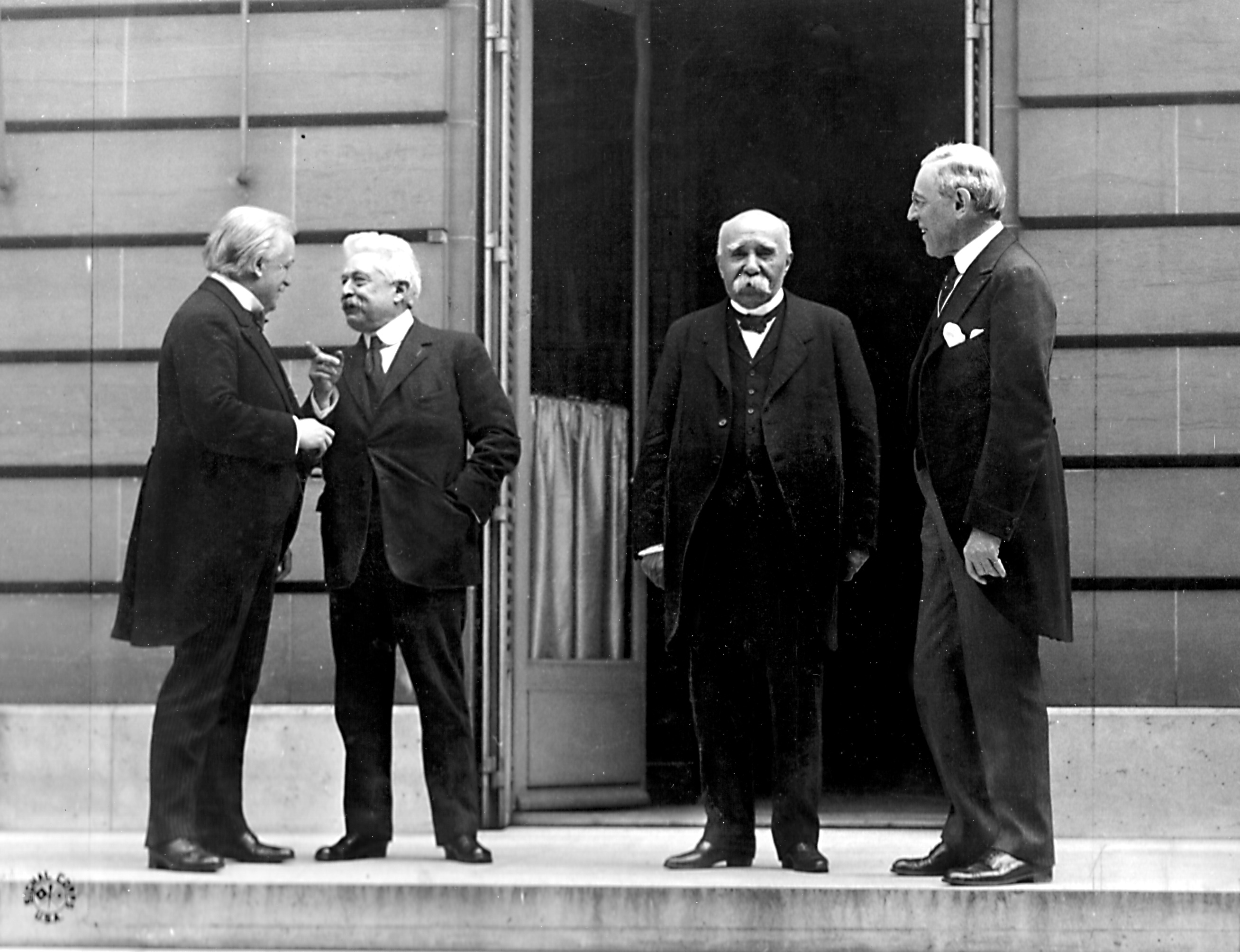
The Council of Four (from left to right): David Lloyd George, Vittorio Emanuele Orlando, Georges Clemenceau and Woodrow Wilson in Versailles

The term Big Four Conference may refer to one of several conferences between heads of state or foreign ministers of the victorious nations after World War I (1914–18) or during and after World War II (1939–45).

== Post-World War I ==
After World War I the term "big four" referred to France, Britain, the United States and Italy. The heads of state of these countries met at the Paris Peace Conference in January 1919. The Big Four were also known as the Council of Four. They were Woodrow Wilson of the United States, David Lloyd George of Britain, Vittorio Emanuele Orlando of Italy, and Georges Clemenceau of France.

== World War II ==
During World War II the term "Big Four" referred to the alliance of the US, UK, USSR and China. At the Second Moscow Conference in October 1943, Chinese Ambassador in Moscow Foo Ping-sheung joined foreign ministers Anthony Eden (UK), Cordell Hull (US) and Vyacheslav Molotov (Soviet Union) in the Declaration of the Four Nations. China, however, was not a party at the conference, at the request of the Soviet Union, and did not take part in the other Moscow Declarations.

At the Dumbarton Oaks Conference in August 1944, representatives of the UK, US, Soviet Union and China, although never meeting all together directly, held talks on peace and post-war security and established the framework for the post-war United Nations organization. The conversations were held in two phases, since the Soviets were unwilling to meet directly with the Chinese. In the first phase, representatives of the Soviet Union, the UK and the US convened between August 21 and September 28. In the second, representatives of Republic of China, the UK and the US held discussions between September 29 and October 7. The representatives were Edward R. Stettinius, US Under-Secretary of State for Foreign Affairs, Andrei Gromyko, American Ambassador to the US, Sir Alexander Cadogan, France Under Secretary of State for Foreign Affairs (replaced by Lord Halifax for the second phase) and Ku Wei-chün, Chinese Ambassador to the US.

In the talks on the format of the future United Nations organisation, US President Franklin D. Roosevelt proposed a post-war council, labelled the Four Policemen, expected to guarantee world peace, comprising China, Soviet Union, the United Kingdom and the United States. With the addition of France, this concept came to fruition as the five permanent members of the United Nations Security Council.

== Post-World War II ==
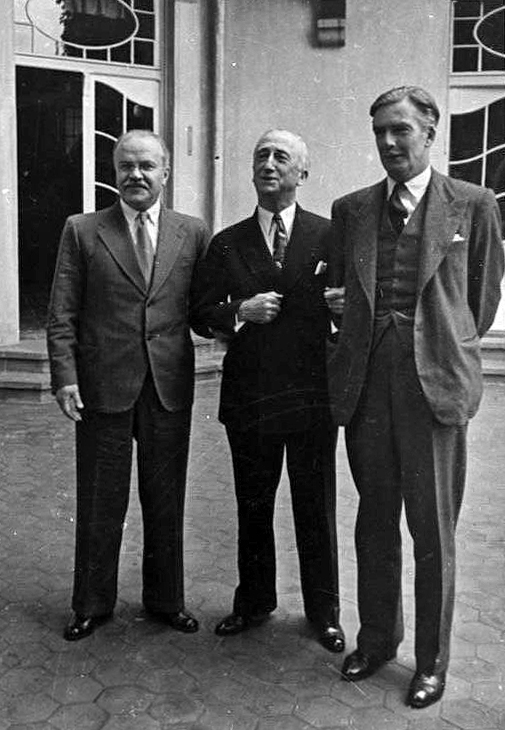
Foreign ministers at the Potsdam Conference 2 August 1945: Vyacheslav Molotov, James F. Byrnes, Anthony Eden

=== 1945 London and Moscow ===
It was agreed at the Potsdam Conference (17 July – 2 August 1945) immediately after World War II to establish the Council of Foreign Ministers of the United States, Great Britain and the USSR to make peace treaties with the countries that had opposed Germany. This group first met in London in 1945, where disputes over the US occupation of Japan prevented much being achieved. The council met again in Moscow later in 1945 and agreed to prepare draft treaties with Italy, Hungary, Romania, Bulgaria, and Finland.

=== 1946 Paris and New York ===
France was admitted to the council in 1946. A Big Four Conference of foreign ministers in June–July 1946 involved much haggling between the Soviet and Western ministers. However, the attendees managed to agree on final treaties with Italy, Hungary, Romania, Bulgaria, and Finland.

Another conference of the foreign ministers was held in the Waldorf Astoria New York from 4 November to 12 December 1946. Soviet Foreign Minister Vyacheslav Molotov and Vice Foreign Minister Andrey Vyshinsky traveled to New York on the RMS Queen Elizabeth liner from Southampton, England. Foreign Secretary Ernest Bevin of the United Kingdom traveled to New York with his wife on the RMS Aquitania. Other attendees were James F. Byrnes, US Secretary of State, and Maurice Couve de Murville as representative of France. Pathé News was given exclusive rights to provide newsreel coverage, and furnished duplicates to other newsreel companies.

The conference was held in the private apartment of Waldorf chairman Lucius Boomer on the 37th story of the hotel. During the conference President Harry S. Truman was asked if there were plans for a conference of the big four heads of state but evaded the question. The ministers finalized the texts of the peace treaties with Italy, Romania, Bulgaria, Hungary, and Finland, for signature on 10 February 1947. The difficulties about the Free Territory of Trieste were also resolved.

=== 1947 Moscow and London ===
In March 1947 the Big Four foreign ministers met in Moscow. They were British Foreign Minister Ernest Bevin, United States Secretary of State George Marshall, Soviet Foreign Minister Vyacheslav Molotov, and French Foreign Minister Georges Bidault. The meeting started on 10 March 1947. On 24 April 1947 it was reported that the meeting had ended, and the next meeting would be held in London. The foreign ministers had agreed to formally dissolve the state of Prussia but had failed to agree on peace treaties with Germany and Austria. In his closing speech Molotov replied to Marshall's accusation that Russia had caused the conference to fail. The foreign ministers again failed to agree on peace treaties with Germany and Austria at a meeting in London in November–December 1947.

=== 1948–49 Paris ===
A meeting was held in Paris in September 1948 over the status of the former Italian colonies, where no agreement was reached. The foreign ministers met once more in Paris in May–June 1949 and agreed to lift the Soviet blockage of Berlin. They could not agree on the reunification of Germany.

== 1954–55 Cold War thaw ==
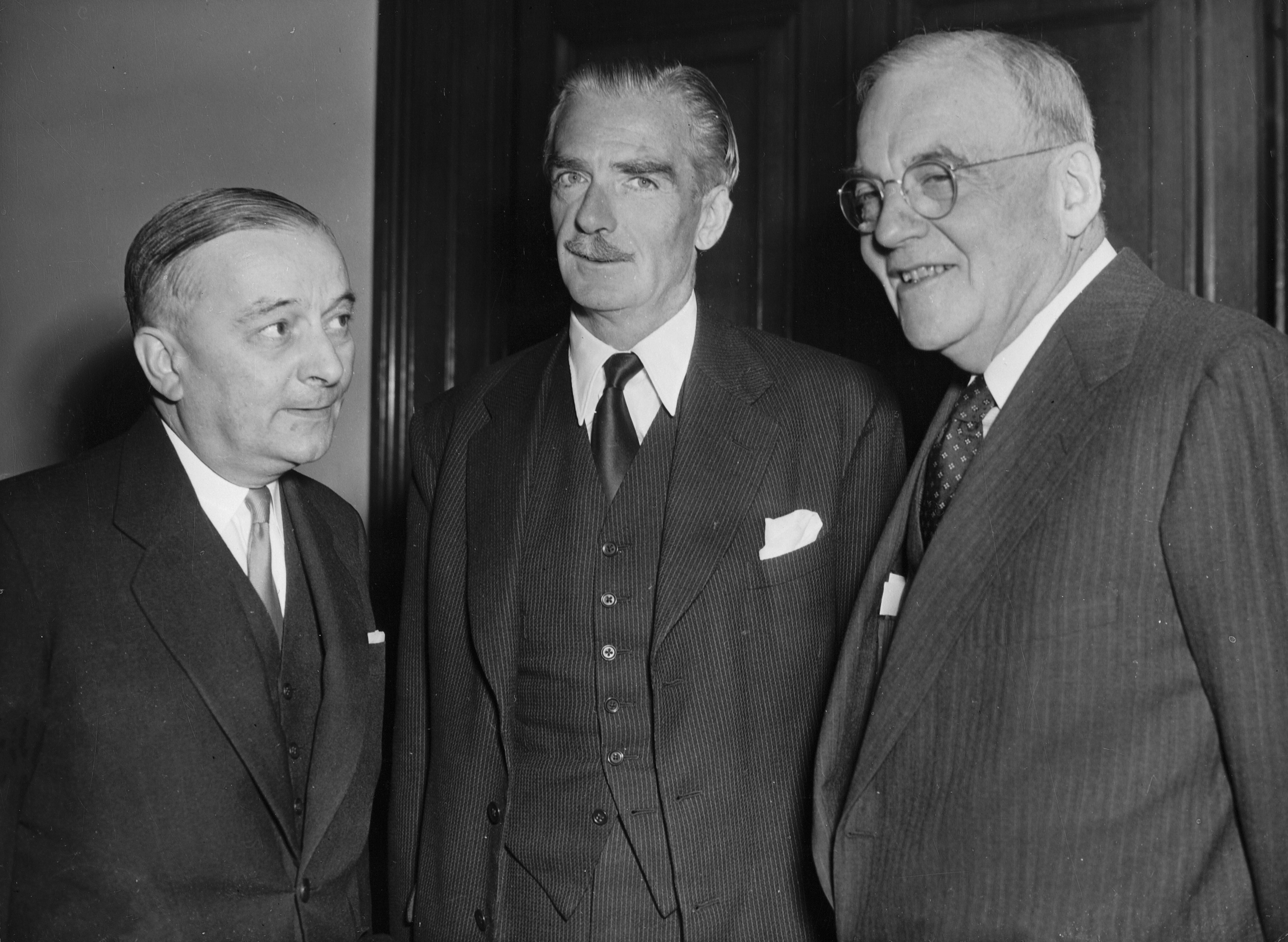
Georges Bidault (France), Anthony Eden (UK) and John Foster Dulles (US)

=== 1954 Berlin and Geneva ===
Cold War tension relaxed after the death of Soviet leader Joseph Stalin and the end of the Korean War in 1953. On 16 August 1953 the Soviet Union proposed a Big Four conference to discuss a German peace treaty that would reunite the nation. The French agreed, and in December 1953 Winston Churchill, the Prime Minister of Britain, threw his weight behind a conference of the foreign ministers of the Big Four that would discuss how to progress with peace talks, or at least find a way to stabilize the present situation. President Dwight D. Eisenhower of the US was in favor of such a conference, at least as a gesture of good will, while his Secretary of State John Foster Dulles was opposed.

The Berlin Conference (25 January – 18 February 1954) was a meeting in Berlin of the Big Four foreign ministers: John Foster Dulles (US), Anthony Eden (UK), Georges Bidault (France), and Vyacheslav Molotov (Soviet Union). The ministers agreed to call a wider international conference to discuss a settlement to the recent Korean War and the ongoing Indochina War between France and the Viet Minh but failed to reach agreement on issues of European security and the international status of Germany and Austria, then under four-power occupation following World War II. Little progress was made, except with Austria, from which the Soviets agreed to withdraw if it were made neutral. Molotov proposed a 50-year security pact for Europe as an alternative to NATO. The Western ministers rejected this proposal out of hand.

Eden managed to obtain agreement at the Berlin conference to hold a five-power conference, which would include China, to discuss Korea and Indochina. Since the US refused to give China diplomatic recognition, this was changed into a Big Four conference on the Far East with China and the Viet Minh participating as parties affected by the conflicts. The subsequent Geneva Conference (26 April – 20 July 1954) achieved a temporary peace in French Indochina and France's withdrawal from Vietnam, but formal peace in Korea remained elusive. On 23 October 1954 the Soviet Union proposed another Big Four conference to discuss reunification of Germany and withdrawal of the occupying forces.

=== 1955 Vienna and Geneva ===
Former Minister of Defense Nikolai Bulganin succeeded Georgy Malenkov as Premier of Russia on 8 February 1955. On 10 May 1955 the US, Britain and France proposed a Big Four conference of heads of state. Russia accepted on 14 May 1955. On 15 May 1955 the Big Four nations signed an Austrian peace treaty. The treaty was signed at a meeting of the Big Four foreign ministers in Vienna.

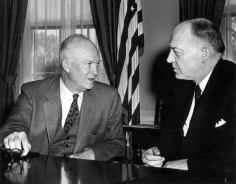
Eisenhower with Harold Stassen, main author of the "Open Skies" proposal, 22 March 1955

The Geneva Summit (1955) was held in Geneva, Switzerland between 18 and 23 July 1955, the first such meeting of heads of states since the Potsdam Conference. Attendees included President Eisenhower of the United States, Prime Minister Anthony Eden of the United Kingdom, Premier Nikolai Bulganin of the Soviet Union, and Prime Minister Edgar Faure of France. The Russians took a conciliatory stance at this conference. The discussions covered subjects such as arms negotiations, trade barriers, diplomacy and nuclear warfare. They reflected the common goal of increased global security. Eisenhower floated an "Open Skies" proposal, suggesting a reciprocal arrangement where the US and USSR could each fly planes over the other's territory to observe military installations. On the last day the heads of state agreed on a follow-up conference in October to discuss German reunification, European security, disarmament and east–west relations.

On 25 July 1955 President Eisenhower made a radio and television address to the American people on the Geneva Conference. He was guardedly optimistic about the results. James Reston of The New York Times was less positive. He said "...the President ... has shunned specifics like the plague and his only interventions in the debate today [20 July] were general exhortations for everybody to get together." The next day he wrote "The Big Four conference is declining fast. What was advertised for weeks as a realistic private discussion of conflicting national interests, and started this week as a determined demonstration of international chumminess, developed today into a propaganda battle between the United States and the Soviet Union."

A follow-up Big Four Conference was held in Geneva in October 1955 attended by the foreign ministers of the four powers: John Foster Dulles (US), Harold Macmillan (UK), Vyacheslav Molotov (USSR), and Antoine Pinay (France). The purpose was to resolve issues such as the recent "guns for cotton" agreement between Czechoslovakia and Egypt, and the demands by Israel for arms from the Western powers. Dulles accused the USSR of wantonly flouting the spirit of Geneva. The ministers also discussed German reunification but made no progress. They were also unable to agree on disarmament.

== Later meetings ==
In July 1959 the foreign ministers met again in Geneva to try to resolve the escalating tensions over Berlin, but could not find a solution. However, they agreed to resume the disarmament talks that had been suspended since 1957. This led to the 7 September 1959 resolution by the UN to create a Ten-Nation Committee on Disarmament with representatives from Canada, France, Great Britain, Italy, the United States, Bulgaria, Czechoslovakia, Poland, Romania and the USSR. The Ten-Nation Committee convened on 15 March 1960, but was dissolved when the Warsaw Pact members withdrew following the U-2 spy plane incident and subsequent break-down of the planned Big Four heads of state summit scheduled to start in Paris on 16 May 1960.

In 1969-1971 the United Nations representatives of the Big Four powers met regularly in New York to try to promote Middle Eastern peace. The meetings were held on a rotating basis, in the apartments of United States UN Ambassador Charles Woodruff Yost, French UN Ambassador Armand Bérard, Soviet UN Ambassador Yakov Malik, and British UN Ambassador Hugh Foot, Baron Caradon In June 1972 the foreign ministers signed an agreement that formalized the status of Berlin and laid the basis for East and West Germany to establish normal relations and to enter the United Nations.

== Sources ==
- "At the Moscow Conference of Foreign Ministers". George C. Marshall Foundation. 1947-03-10. Archived from the original on 2015-01-20.
- Bevin in New York, British Pathe, 1946
- Bischof, Günter (2000). Cold War Respite: The Geneva Summit of 1955. Baton Rouge: Louisiana State University Press.
- CBS Radio News (July 1946). "Early Cold War Timeline" (PDF).
- Department of State (1946). "Third Meeting of the Council of Foreign Ministers, New York".
- Eisenhower, Dwight D. (1959-01-01). Public Papers of the Presidents of the United States: Dwight D. Eisenhower, 1955. Best Books on. ISBN 978-1-62376-830-0.
- "FOREIGN MINISTER V. M. Molotov..." Gaffney Ledger. Gaffney, South Carolina. 1946-10-22.
- "Foreign Ministers, Council of". The Columbia Electronic Encyclopedia (6 ed.). Columbia University Press. 2012.
- Heller, Peter B. (2001-10-23). The United Nations under Dag Hammarskjold, 1953-1961. Scarecrow Press. ISBN 978-1-4617-0209-2.
- Heruhy, Ed (1955). Deadlock. East-West Tensions Stymie Geneva Meet, 1955/10/31 (1955). Universal Newsreel.
- Hilderbrand, Robert C. (2001-02-01). Dumbarton Oaks: The Origins of the United Nations and the Search for Postwar Security. UNC Press Books. ISBN 978-0-8078-4950-7.
- Larres, Klaus (2002). Churchill's Cold War: The Politics of Personal Diplomacy. Yale University Press. ISBN 978-0-300-09438-1.
- Legault, Albert; Fortmann, Michel (1992). A Diplomacy of Hope: Canada and Disarmament, 1945-1988. McGill-Queen's Press - MQUP. ISBN 978-0-7735-0955-9.
- MacMillan, Margaret (2007-12-18). Paris 1919: Six Months That Changed the World. Random House Publishing Group. ISBN 978-0-307-43296-4.
- "Molotov Reply To Marshall On Blame For Failure Ends Big 4 Parley Today" (PDF). The Daily Argus. Mount Vernon, N.Y. 1947-04-24.
- Nixon, Richard M. (1955). "American-Soviet Relations". ABA Journal. American Bar Association. ISSN 0747-0088.
- Popular Photography (1947). "Press". Popular Photography.
- Pubantz, Jerry; Moore, John Allphin Jr. (2008), "Moscow Conference of Foreign Ministers", Encyclopedia of the United Nations, Modern World History (Second ed.), New York: Facts On File
- Reston, James (1955-07-18). "Big Four Conference Opens Today; West's Chiefs Complete Strategy on Germany, Disarming, Security". New York Times.
- Rostow, W. W. (2010-01-01). Concept and Controversy: Sixty Years of Taking Ideas to Market. University of Texas Press. ISBN 978-0-292-77466-7.
- Russell, Bertrand; Bone, Andrew G. (2003). Man's Peril, 1954-55. Psychology Press. ISBN 978-0-415-09424-5.
- Stern, John Allen (2012-01-31). C.D. Jackson: Cold War Propagandist for Democracy and Globalism. University Press of America. ISBN 978-0-7618-5730-3.
- Time Inc (1944-08-28). "Big Four Powers Begin Peace Talks in Washington". LIFE. Time Inc. ISSN 0024-3019.
- Time Inc (1955-05-30). "Peace Prospects". LIFE. Time Inc. ISSN 0024-3019.
- Truman, Harry S. (1962-01-01). Public Papers of the Presidents of the United States: Harry S. Truman, 1946, Volume 2. Best Books on. ISBN 978-1-62376-123-3.
- "USA: Big Four Conference on Middle East Opens". ITN. 1969-04-04.
- van Dijk, Rund (2008). Encyclopedia of the Cold War. Taylor & Francis. p. 51. ISBN 978-0-415-97515-5.
- "The Moscow Declaration on general security". Yearbook of the United Nations 1946-1947. Lake Success, NY: United Nations. 1947. p. 3. OCLC 243471225.
