= October 1947 =

Month of 1947

<<	October 1947					>>
Su	Mo	Tu	We	Th	Fr	Sa
			1	2	3	4
5	6	7	8	9	10	11
12	13	14	15	16	17	18
19	20	21	22	23	24	25
26	27	28	29	30	31

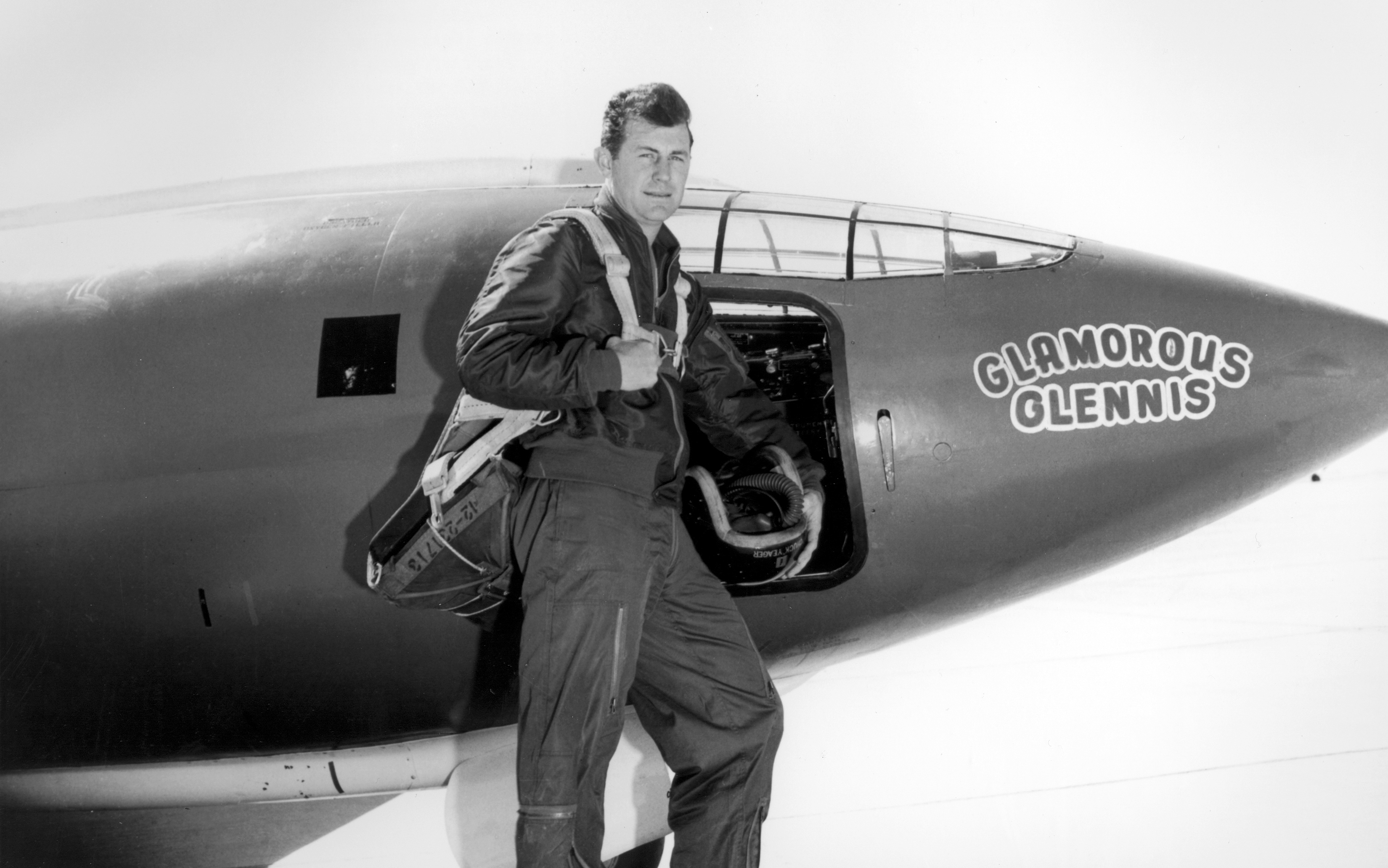
American test pilot Chuck Yeager with the Bell X-1 aircraft, in which he became the first man to break the sound barrier on October 14, 1947.

The following events occurred in October 1947:

== October 1, 1947 (Wednesday) ==
- Dragoljub Yovanovich, leader of the Serbian Peasant Party, went on trial in Belgrade on charges of espionage and treason.
- The North American F-86 Sabre had its first flight.
- Rita Hayworth filed for divorce from Orson Welles.
- Born: Justice Dalveer Bhandari, judge (notably at The International Court of Justice) and lawyer, in Jodhpur, Rajasthan, India, Dave Arneson, game designer and co-developer of Dungeons & Dragons, in Hennepin County, Minnesota (d. 2009); Aaron Ciechanover, biologist and Nobel laureate, in Haifa, Mandatory Palestine; Stephen Collins, actor, in Des Moines, Iowa; Larry Lamb, actor and radio presenter, in Edmonton, Middlesex, England;
- Died: Olive Borden, 41, American film and stage actress

== October 2, 1947 (Thursday) ==
- The Jewish Agency for Palestine gave conditional approval to a plan to partition Palestine into a Jewish and Arab state.
- The National Labor Relations Board issued its first temporary restraining order under the Taft-Hartley Act, ordering the AFL to end a 10-day strike in Albany, New York.
- The São Paulo Museum of Art opened to the public in São Paulo, Brazil.
- Died: P. D. Ouspensky, 69, Russian mathematician and esotericist

== October 3, 1947 (Friday) ==
- Palestinian Arabs staged a peaceful one-day general strike to protest the plan to partition the territory.
- Bill Bevens of the New York Yankees came within one out of recording a no-hitter in Game 4 of the World Series against the Brooklyn Dodgers. With two out in the bottom of the ninth and a pair of Dodgers aboard on walks, pinch-hitter Cookie Lavagetto walloped a walk-off double to give Brooklyn a dramatic 3-2 victory.
- Born: Fred DeLuca, businessman and co-founder of the Subway franchise of sandwich shops, in Brooklyn, New York (d. 2015); Alain Mucchielli, biochemist, in Toulon, France

== October 4, 1947 (Saturday) ==
- The Danish Lower Chamber of Parliament ousted Prime Minister Knud Kristensen when it passed a vote of no confidence, 80 to 66.
- Born: Ann Widdecombe, politician and novelist, in Bath, Somerset, England
- Died: Max Planck, 89, German theoretical physicist and Nobel laureate

== October 5, 1947 (Sunday) ==
- US President Harry S. Truman made the first-ever televised address from the White House, urging Americans to voluntarily observe meatless Tuesdays and poultryless Thursdays in order to make more food available for hungry Europeans.
- The Actors Studio was founded in New York City.
- Born: Brian Johnson, lead singer of rock band AC/DC, in Dunston, Gateshead, England

== October 6, 1947 (Monday) ==
- The Canadian government announced that it would double its acceptance of European displaced persons to 20,000.
- The New York Yankees defeated the Brooklyn Dodgers 5-2 to win the 1947 World Series in seven games.
- Born: Gail Farrell, singer and songwriter, in Salinas, California
- Died: Leevi Madetoja, 60, Finnish composer

== October 7, 1947 (Tuesday) ==
- Pakistan became the first member of the United Nations to line up with the Arab states in opposition to the Palestine partition plan.
- UK Prime Minister Clement Attlee performed a cabinet reshuffle. New appointments included Christopher Addison as Lord Privy Seal, Kenneth Younger as Under-Secretary of State for the Home Department and Arthur Henderson as Secretary of State for Air.
- Born: Pip Williams, record producer, arranger and guitarist, in Hillingdon, Middlesex, England

== October 8, 1947 (Wednesday) ==
- At the United Nations, the Soviet bloc threw its support to the Palestine partition plan.
- Born: Stephen Shore, photographer, in New York City

== October 9, 1947 (Thursday) ==
- In and over Wilmington, Delaware, a conversation was held between telephones in an airplane and a car for the first time.
- Eleven people are killed in a mass stabbing in Bangi, Malaya.
- The biopic Song of Love starring Katharine Hepburn as the pianist Clara Wieck and Paul Henreid as the composer Robert Schumann was released.
- The stage musical High Button Shoes with music by Jule Styne, lyrics by Sammy Cahn and book by George Abbott and Stephen Longstreet premiered on Broadway at the New Century Theatre.
- Born: France Gall, singer, in Paris, France (d. 2018)

== October 10, 1947 (Friday) ==
- The American flag was flown at half-mast as some 3,000 war dead arrived in San Francisco aboard the military transport Honda Knot. The ship's arrival marked the tangible beginning of Operation Taps, a program to rebury over 250,000 known war dead from overseas on American soil.
- The Rodgers and Hammerstein stage musical Allegro opened on Broadway at the Majestic Theatre.

== October 11, 1947 (Saturday) ==
- Yugoslavia broke off diplomatic relations with Chile over allegations that Yugoslavia had sponsored communist plotting in South America.

== October 12, 1947 (Sunday) ==
- Municipal elections in Rome resulted in the continued leadership of the Communist-led People's Bloc, which edged out the Christian Democrats by less than 1% of the vote.
- A special mission of the United Nations recommended establishment of a "government of Western Samoa" to give a larger measure of autonomy to the territory administered by New Zealand.
- Died: Ian Standish Monteith Hamilton, 94, British general

== October 13, 1947 (Monday) ==
- The 1st National Hockey League All-Star Game was held at Maple Leaf Gardens in Toronto. A team of all-stars defeated the Toronto Maple Leafs, 4-3.
- The children's TV puppet show Kukla, Fran and Ollie premiered as Junior Jamboree on WBKB in Chicago, Illinois. It would run for ten years.
- Born: Sammy Hagar, rock musician and entrepreneur, in Salinas, California
- Died: Sidney Webb, 1st Baron Passfield, 88, British economist and social reformer

== October 14, 1947 (Tuesday) ==
- The Bell X-1 made the first supersonic flight of a piloted airplane by traveling 700 miles per hour (1,100 km/h) (Mach 1.06 at 43,000 feet (13,000 m) altitude) over Muroc Dry Lake, California, with Captain Charles E. Yeager at the controls. The sound barrier was broken.
- Born: Nikolai Volkoff, professional wrestler, as Josip Nikolai Peruzović in the Socialist Republic of Croatia (d. 2018)

== October 15, 1947 (Wednesday) ==
- The Draft Eisenhower for President League in Washington announced its slogan: "I Like Ike".
- Censorship was lifted in Finland after a law passed during the Winter War in 1939 expired.

== October 16, 1947 (Thursday) ==
- The New York State Court of Appeals ruled that a false charge of a person being a Communist or a communist sympathizer was basis for a libel action.
- Born: Bob Weir, singer, songwriter, guitarist and founding member of the Grateful Dead, in San Francisco, California

== October 17, 1947 (Friday) ==
- Britain granted independence to Burma effective in January 1948.
- Born: Gene Green, politician, in Houston, Texas; Michael McKean, actor, comedian and musician, in New York City
- Died: John Halliday, 67, American actor

== October 18, 1947 (Saturday) ==
- American Federation of Musicians President James Petrillo banned the making of recordings and transcriptions by the union's 225,000 AFM members. The ban was to become operative December 31.
- Born: Job Cohen, politician, in Haarlem, Netherlands; James H. Fallon, neuroscientist, in the United States, Joe Morton, American actor (d. 2023)

== October 19, 1947 (Sunday) ==
- Municipal elections were held in France. The Gaullist Reunion of the French people won with 40% of the popular vote, compared to 30% for the Communists.
- Czechoslovakia's Social Democrats announced that they had merged into one national party and would continue to resist any merger with the Communists.
- Born: Giorgio Cavazzano, comic strip artist, in Venice, Italy; Gunnar Staalesen, writer, in Bergen, Norway

== October 20, 1947 (Monday) ==
- The RuSHA trial began at Nuremberg. 14 officials of various SS organizations including RuSHA went on trial for their racial and resettlement activities.
- The House Un-American Activities Committee began its first hearings into alleged Communist activities in the Hollywood movie industry

== October 21, 1947 (Tuesday) ==
- Brazil and Chile severed diplomatic relations with the USSR.
- A new session of British Parliament was opened with a surprise announcement from George VI during the King's Speech that legislation would be introduced to curb the powers of the House of Lords.

== October 22, 1947 (Wednesday) ==
- The Pakistani tribal invasion of Jammu and Kashmir began.
- Iranian Parliament voted 102-2 to reject an oil agreement signed with Russia that would have given the Soviet Union a 51 percent share in a Soviet-Iran oil company. Parliament then approved Prime Minister Ahmad Qavam's bill to initiate a five-year oil exploration program from which all foreign capital would be barred.
- Born: Ed Welch, television composer, in England
- Died: Friedrich Schubert, 50, German sergeant (executed for war crimes committed during the Nazi occupation of Greece)

== October 23, 1947 (Thursday) ==
- Gary Cooper, Robert Montgomery and Ronald Reagan were among the parade of witnesses who testified before the House Un-American Activities Commission in Washington. Cooper testified, "I've turned down quite a few scripts given to me because I thought they were tinged with communist propaganda."
- Born: Greg Ridley, rock bassist (Humble Pie), in Carlisle, Cumbria, England (d. 2003)

== October 24, 1947 (Friday) ==
- United Airlines Flight 608, a Douglas DC-6 airliner flying from Los Angeles to Chicago, crashed southeast of Bryce Canyon Airport in Utah. All 52 aboard were killed. This crash marked the first time a plane would be reconstructed from the wreckage to determine the cause of the disaster; a design flaw was found in the cabin heater system that caused a fire to break out on board.
- Born: Kevin Kline, actor, in St. Louis, Missouri
- Died: Dudley Digges, 68, Irish actor

== October 25, 1947 (Saturday) ==
- President Truman declared Maine a disaster area as forest fires caused 17 deaths and an estimated $30 million in damage.
- The Humpty Dumpty pinball machine by Gottlieb was released. It was the first pinball machine to include flippers.
- Born: Glenn Tipton, heavy metal guitarist (Judas Priest), in Blackheath, England

== October 26, 1947 (Sunday) ==
- A Douglas DC-4 crashed into Mt. Hymettus while on approach to Hassani Airport in a severe rainstorm. All 44 on board were killed.
- Pan Am Flight 923, a Douglas DC-4 flying from Seattle, Washington to Juneau, Alaska, crashed on Annette Island, killing all 18 on board. The cause of the crash was never determined.
- Maharaja Hari Singh, ruler of the princely state of Jammu and Kashmir, following the tribal invasion and killings of minorities, executed the Instrument of Accession agreeing to accede to the Dominion of India.
- Born: Hillary Clinton, politician and First Lady of the United States, née Hillary Rodham in Chicago, Illinois; Trevor Joyce, poet, in Dublin, Ireland

== October 27, 1947 (Monday) ==
- India air-lifted troops to defend Jammu and Kashmir (the start of Indo-Pakistani War of 1947)
- The USSR joined the International Association of Athletics Federations, leaving no obstacles to participation in the 1948 Olympic Games.
- The game show You Bet Your Life hosted by Groucho Marx premiered on ABC Radio.
- Born: Terry A. Anderson, American journalist, in Lorain, Ohio (d. 2024)

== October 28, 1947 (Tuesday) ==
- Folketing elections were held in Denmark. The Social Democratic Party led by Hans Hedtoft remained the largest party, winning 57 of 148 seats.
- 1947 Oregon Beechcraft Bonanza crash: Oregon Governor Earl Snell, State Senate President Marshall E. Cornett and Oregon Secretary of State Robert S. Farrell, Jr. were killed in a crash of a Beechcraft Bonanza in stormy weather in rural Lake County, Oregon.
- The USSR
- Died: Marshall E. Cornett, 48, American politician (plane crash); Robert S. Farrell, Jr., 41, politician (plane crash); Earl Snell, 52, American politician and 23rd Governor of Oregon (plane crash)

== October 29, 1947 (Wednesday) ==
- The USSR began a purge of non-communist officials in the Soviet occupation zone of Germany.
- In Washington, the presidential committee on civil rights delivered a 178-page report to the White House stating, "The American ideal still awaits complete realization." The document made thirty-five specific recommendations, including asking the President to create a permanent Federal commission on civil rights. President Truman issued a statement declaring, "I am going to read and study this report with great care and I recommend to all my countrymen that they do the same thing."
- Born: Richard Dreyfuss, actor, in Brooklyn, New York; Mirza Khazar, author, anchorman and journalist, in Göyçay, Azerbaijan SSR (d. 2020)
- Died: Frances Folsom Cleveland Preston, 83, 22nd and 24th First Lady of the United States

== October 30, 1947 (Thursday) ==
- 23 nations in Geneva signed the General Agreement on Tariffs and Trade (GATT).
- Born: Timothy B. Schmit, bass player and singer (Poco, Eagles), in Oakland, California

== October 31, 1947 (Friday) ==
- Former Romanian Prime Minister Iuliu Maniu confessed at his show trial that he'd told the American diplomat Burton Y. Berry that he intended to form a Romanian resistance government abroad.
- The Greek government announced emergency tax measures to raise an additional 600 million drachmas by June 30, 1948. The taxes were held to be necessary to meet increased military expenditures and to look after some 300,000 refugees from the civil war.
- Born: Herman Van Rompuy, Prime Minister of Belgium from 2008 to 2009, in Etterbeek, Belgium
