= May 1947 =

Month of 1947

<<	May 1947					>>
Su	Mo	Tu	We	Th	Fr	Sa
				1	2	3
4	5	6	7	8	9	10
11	12	13	14	15	16	17
18	19	20	21	22	23	24
25	26	27	28	29	30	31

The following events occurred in May 1947:

== May 1, 1947 (Thursday) ==
- Portella della Ginestra massacre: 11 people were killed and 27 wounded during May Day celebrations in Sicily. The attack was attributed to the bandit and separatist leader Salvatore Giuliano.
- Singapore Airlines was founded.
- Died:
  - Evelyn McHale, 23, American bookkeeper, committed suicide by jumping off the Empire State Building. Minutes after her death a famous photograph was taken of her peaceful-looking body, referred to as "the most beautiful suicide".
  - Jack Malone, 34, former Australian rugby union international, was killed on duty as a police constable in a motorcycle accident.

== May 2, 1947 (Friday) ==
- A fistfight broke out in the Italian Chamber of Deputies over who was to blame for the Portella della Ginestra massacre.
- New York City concluded a three-week campaign against smallpox after dispensing six million vaccinations.
- The comedy-drama film Miracle on 34th Street starring Maureen O'Hara and John Payne was released.
- Died: Dorothea Binz, 27, German SS supervisor at Ravensbrück concentration camp (executed by hanging); William Moulton Marston, 53, American psychologist and comic book writer who created the character Wonder Woman

== May 3, 1947 (Saturday) ==
- The Constitution of Japan went into effect, replacing the old Meiji Constitution.
- Jet Pilot won the Kentucky Derby.
- Bradford Northern defeated Leeds 8–4 to win the Challenge Cup of rugby before 77,605 at Wembley Stadium.
- Born: Richard Jenkins, actor, in DeKalb, Illinois

== May 4, 1947 (Sunday) ==
- The Acre Prison break occurred in Acre, Palestine when the Irgun broke through the prison's walls and freed 28 incarcerated Irgun and Lehi members.
- Born: Theda Skocpol, sociologist and political scientist, in Detroit, Michigan

== May 5, 1947 (Monday) ==
- May 1947 crises: French Prime Minister Paul Ramadier dismissed all five Communists in his cabinet because they had voted against him in a confidence motion, leaving no Communist membership in the coalition government for the first time since liberation.
- The 1947 Pulitzer Prizes were announced. Arnold Hardy became the first amateur to win a Pulitzer when he was named in Photography for his picture capturing a woman falling from Atlanta's Winecoff Hotel during the disastrous fire there on December 7, 1946. Other winners included Brooks Atkinson of The New York Times for Correspondence and Robert Penn Warren in the Fiction category for his novel All the King's Men.
- The United States Supreme Court decided Rice v. Santa Fe Elevator Corp..

== May 6, 1947 (Tuesday) ==
- The war crimes trial of Albert Kesselring ended in a death sentence.
- Born: Martha Nussbaum, philosopher, in New York City

== May 7, 1947 (Wednesday) ==
- Nine miners died in a pit explosion at Barnsley, England.
- The TV anthology series Kraft Television Theatre premiered on NBC.

== May 8, 1947 (Thursday) ==
- The House Un-American Activities Committee chaired by J. Parnell Thomas convened in Hollywood to investigate allegations of communism in the film industry.
- National League President Ford C. Frick reported that the St. Louis Cardinals management had put down a players' strike protesting Jackie Robinson being allowed to play in the major leagues. Cardinals players denied the incident had occurred.
- Born: H. Robert Horvitz, Nobel prize winning biologist, in Chicago, Illinois
- Died: Harry Gordon Selfridge, 89, American retail magnate and founder of the Selfridges department store chain

== May 9, 1947 (Friday) ==
- Over 100,000 trade unionists in Hamburg, Germany and their supporters gathered to protest food shortages in the British-occupied zone. The population of the city was only receiving about 800 calories of food per day instead of the prescribed 1500.
- The Brooklyn Dodgers paid their first visit of the season to Shibe Park in Philadelphia. To make amends for the negative publicity generated by the racist taunting incident of April 22, Phillies manager Ben Chapman was coaxed into standing next to Jackie Robinson for a photograph in which both men posed stiffly while holding the same bat.
- Died: Willie Francis, 18, American convicted murderer who survived a failed execution by electric chair on May 3, 1946 (executed by electric chair)

== May 10, 1947 (Saturday) ==
- Twelve German generals, including Wilhelm List and Maximilian von Weichs, were indicted at Nuremberg on charges of war crimes.
- Faultless won the Preakness Stakes.
- Born: Andrew Card, White House Chief of Staff from 2001 to 2006, in Brockton, Massachusetts

== May 11, 1947 (Sunday) ==
- The B.F. Goodrich company announced the development of the tubeless tire, a technological innovation that would make automobiles safer and more efficient.
- Born: Walter Selke, theoretical physicist, in Hanover, Germany (d. 2023)

== May 12, 1947 (Monday) ==
- Syrian delegate to the United Nations Fares al-Khoury told the General Assembly's Political Committee that Zionism was a "fatal dream" and that the Arabs "will never permit it to succeed."
- Born: Michael Ignatieff, author, academic and politician, in Toronto, Canada

== May 13, 1947 (Tuesday) ==
- Chinese Communist forces initiated the Summer Offensive of 1947 in Northeast China.
- By a vote of 68–24, the US Senate passed the Taft-Hartley Bill, revising the National Labor Relations Act of 1935. The bill outlawed closed shop and jurisdictional strikes, among other union practices.
- Francoist Spain was kicked out of the International Civil Aviation Organization, in accordance with a recommendation from the United Nations General Assembly that Spain be debarred from membership in international agencies affiliated with the UN.
- Born: Stephen R. Donaldson, fantasy novelist, in Cleveland, Ohio
- Died: Sukanta Bhattacharya, 20, Benghali poet and playwright (tuberculosis)

== May 14, 1947 (Wednesday) ==
- A "united Europe" meeting was held at the Royal Albert Hall in London. Winston Churchill spoke in favour of a European union and urged Britain and France to take the lead in restoring Germany's economy before the German people "turn their thoughts to revolt and revenge."
- The Parliament of Canada repealed the Chinese Immigration Act of 1923, which had banned most forms of Chinese immigration to Canada.
- Died: John R. Sinnock, 58, eighth Chief Engraver of the United States Mint

== May 15, 1947 (Thursday) ==
- The United Nations General Assembly formally established an 11-nation committee of inquiry into the Palestine question. Palestinians were urged to refrain from violence pending a decision in autumn 1947.
- 15th century Swiss hermit and ascetic Nicholas of Flüe was canonized as a saint by Pope Pius XII.

== May 16, 1947 (Friday) ==
- General elections were held in the Dominican Republic. For the first time since 1924 there was more than one presidential candidate, but the incumbent Rafael Trujillo remained in power after claiming 93% of the vote.
- Three days after booting Spain, the International Civil Aviation Organization unanimously voted to accept Italy to its membership.
- Died: Frederick Gowland Hopkins, 85, English biochemist and Nobel laureate; Kalle Hakala, 67, Finnish politician; Zhang Lingfu, 43, Chinese general of the National Revolutionary Army (killed in action during Menglianggu campaign)

== May 17, 1947 (Saturday) ==
- Japanese Finance Minister Tanzan Ishibashi, Justice Minister Tokutaro Kimura and Commerce and Industry Minister Mitsujirō Ishii were purged from cabinet and forbidden any further political activity because of their roles in the time of the Empire.
- Died: George Forbes, 78, Prime Minister of New Zealand from 1930 to 1935; Seabiscuit, 13, American champion Thoroughbred racehorse

== May 18, 1947 (Sunday) ==
- The American Association of Scientific Workers issued a 40,000-word technical summary warning that the United States would be especially vulnerable to biological warfare.
- Wrigley Field in Chicago recorded the largest regular season paid attendance in its history when 46,572 people came out to see Jackie Robinson make his first appearance at the ballpark for the Brooklyn Dodgers against the Cubs (A Ladies' Day at Wrigley in 1930 had recorded an attendance of 51,556, but that was not the paid attendance record since women got in free.) Robinson went 0-for-4 but the Dodgers won, 4–2.
- Died: Hal Chase, 64, American baseball player; Edmund FitzAlan-Howard, 1st Viscount FitzAlan of Derwent, 91, British politician; Lucile Gleason, 59, American actress

== May 19, 1947 (Monday) ==
- Italy formally applied for UN membership.
- The US Supreme Court decided Craig v. Harney, ruling 6–3 that news stories criticizing a trial judge did not constitute contempt of court, thus setting aside the convictions of three Texas newspapermen.
- BJK İnönü Stadium opened in Istanbul, Turkey.
- Born: Paul Brady, singer-songwriter, in Strabane, Northern Ireland

== May 20, 1947 (Tuesday) ==
- The Viet Minh announced the execution of Hòa Hảo leader Huỳnh Phú Sổ.
- The US telephone operators' strike ended after six weeks when the last remaining strikers agreed to a two-year, no-strike contract with an average wage increase of 11½ cents an hour.
- Died: Bruno Bräuer, 54, German paratrooper (executed by firing squad in Greece for war crimes); Philipp Lenard, 84, German physicist and Nobel laureate; Friedrich-Wilhelm Müller, 49, German general (executed by firing squad in Greece for war crimes)

== May 21, 1947 (Wednesday) ==
- In Greenville, South Carolina, a case that drew national attention came to an end when 28 men charged with murder and conspiracy in the February 17 lynching of Willie Earle, an African-American man, were acquitted by an all-white jury. Pandemonium broke out on the floor of the courtroom, but once order was restored Judge J. Robert Martin expressed displeasure with the verdict by leaving without the customary courtesy of thanking the jury for their service.

== May 22, 1947 (Thursday) ==
- President Harry S. Truman signed the Truman Doctrine into law, granting $400 million in aid to stabilize the Turkish and Greek governments in an effort to contain communism.
- The USA's first guided ballistic missile, the 45-foot long Corporal, was first fired.

== May 23, 1947 (Friday) ==
- The British cabinet agreed to Viceroy Mountbatten's plan to partition India into two states, one Muslim and one Hindu.
- Aerobatics pilot Thea Rasche was cleared by a German denazification court. Rasche admitted to holding a Nazi Party membership card since 1933, but her flying comrades testified that she had only been a nominal member and that she had a reputation among German sportsmen as an anti-Nazi.
- Born: Ken Westerfield, pioneering Frisbee player, in Detroit, Michigan
- Died: Charles-Ferdinand Ramuz, 68, Swiss writer

== May 24, 1947 (Saturday) ==
- Tetsu Katayama replaced Shigeru Yoshida as Prime Minister of Japan.
- Born: Maude Barlow, author, in Toronto, Canada

== May 25, 1947 (Sunday) ==
- Finland announced that it planned to experiment with Soviet-style collective farming.
- 13,000 coal miners of the Dominion Steel and Coal Corporation in Nova Scotia, Canada ended a 99-day strike pending a final settlement that would give them a $1 per day wage increase.

== May 26, 1947 (Monday) ==
- Leonardo Argüello Barreto was ousted from the presidency of Nicaragua in a bloodless coup initiated by units of the Nicaraguan National Guard.
- Moscow radio announced that the Presidium of the Supreme Soviet had abolished capital punishment.
- Born: Darrell Evans, baseball player, in Pasadena, California; Glenn Turner, cricketer, in Dunedin, New Zealand

== May 27, 1947 (Tuesday) ==
- 22 Germans convicted of atrocities at Mauthausen-Gusen concentration camp were hanged at Landsberg Prison.
- Born: Peter DeFazio, politician, in Needham, Massachusetts; Branko Oblak, footballer and coach, in Ljubljana, SFR Yugoslavia
- Died: Ed Konetchy, 61, American baseball player

== May 28, 1947 (Wednesday) ==
- The House Un-American Activities Committee ordered an investigation to follow up a sub-committee report that "some of the most flagrant Communist propaganda films were produced as a result of White House pressure."
- Born: Lynn Johnston, cartoonist and creator of the comic strip For Better or For Worse, in Collingwood, Ontario, Canada
- Died: August Eigruber, 40, Austrian-born Nazi Gauleiter (hanged at Landsberg Prison)

== May 29, 1947 (Thursday) ==
- Three major plane crashes occurred on the same day. United Airlines Flight 521, a Douglas DC-4, crashed attempting to take off from LaGuardia Airport for Cleveland, killing 43 of the 48 aboard. It was the worst commercial aviation disaster in United States history at the time, although this record only stood for one day. A Douglas DC-4 of the U.S. Army crashed into a mountain near Atsugi Naval Base while attempting to land, killing all 40 aboard. Finally, a Flugfélag Íslands Douglas DC-3 crashed in northern Iceland in poor weather, killing all 25 aboard.
- The Office of Price Administration was dissolved in the United States.
- Born: Stan Zemanek, radio broadcaster, in Sydney, Australia (died 2007)
- Died: Franz Böhme, 62, Austrian military officer and Commander-in-Chief in Nazi-occupied Norway (committed suicide in prison in Nuremberg)

== May 30, 1947 (Friday) ==
- Eastern Air Lines Flight 605: A Douglas C-54 Skymaster crashed near Bainbridge, Maryland en route from Newark to Miami, killing all 53 aboard. It was the worst commercial aviation disaster in US history.
- Died: Georg von Trapp, 67, Austro-Hungarian Navy officer and patriarch of the Von Trapp family of The Sound of Music fame
- Circa May 30, 1947, a German V-2 sounding rocket fired from White Sands Proving Ground veered off course, crashed and exploded on top of a rocky knoll 3.5 miles south of the Juarez, Mexico business district

== May 31, 1947 (Saturday) ==
- Ferenc Nagy was ousted as Prime Minister of Hungary while vacationing in Switzerland, under blackmail of being accused as part of an anti-state plot. He was replaced by Lajos Dinnyés.
- Phalanx won the Belmont Stakes.
- Died: Adrienne Ames, 40, American film actress; Jimmy Wilson, 46, American soccer and baseball player
