= Flight 605 =

Flight 605 may refer to:

- Eastern Air Lines Flight 605, crashed on 30 May 1947
- Indian Airlines Flight 605, crashed on 14 February 1990
- China Airlines Flight 605, overran the runway on 4 November 1993
