= November 1947 =

Month of 1947

| << | November 1947 | | | | | >> |
| Su | Mo | Tu | We | Th | Fr | Sa |
| | | | | | | 1 |
| 2 | 3 | 4 | 5 | 6 | 7 | 8 |
| 9 | 10 | 11 | 12 | 13 | 14 | 15 |
| 16 | 17 | 18 | 19 | 20 | 21 | 22 |
| 23 | 24 | 25 | 26 | 27 | 28 | 29 |
| 30 |

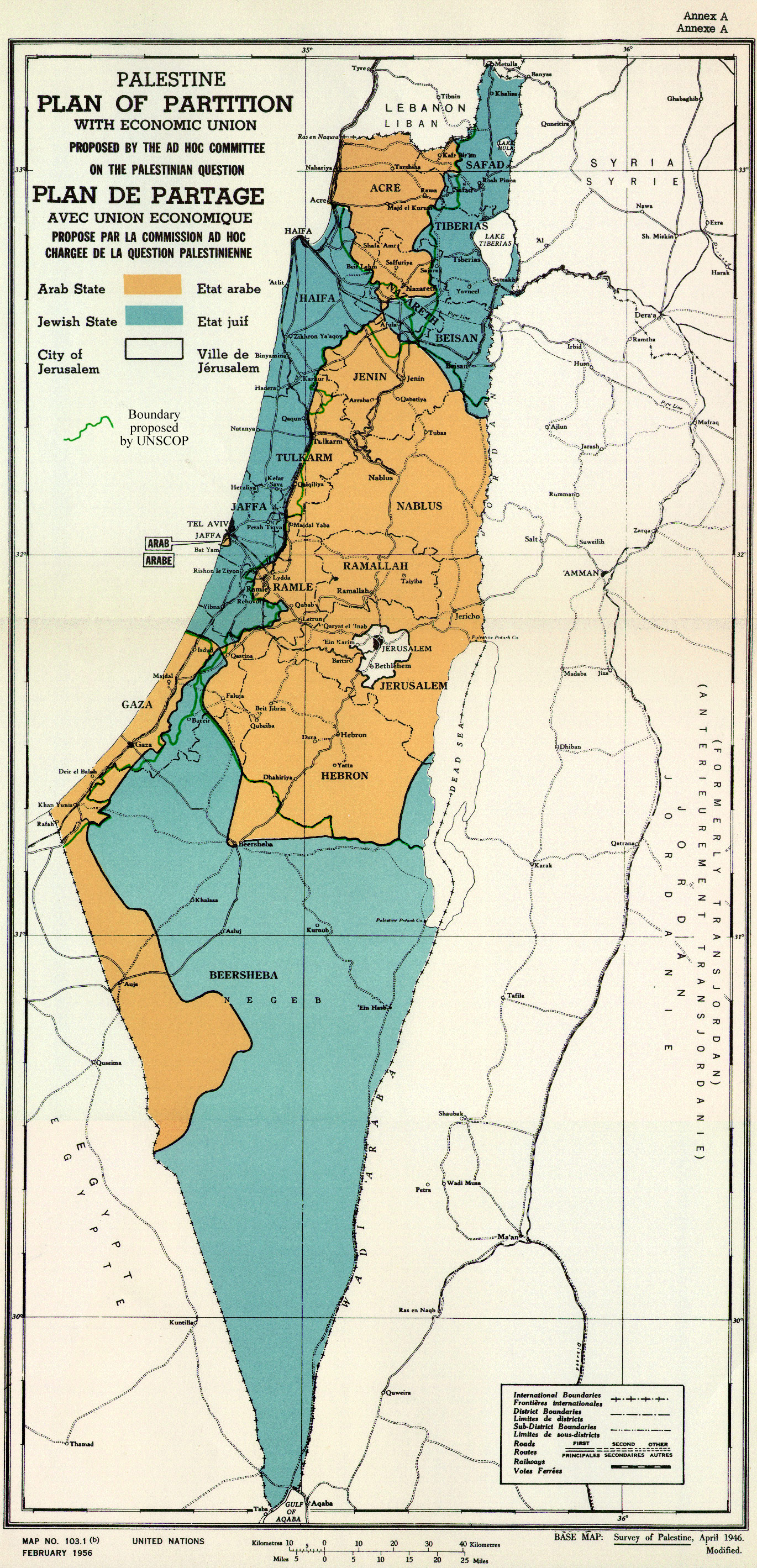
November 29: The United Nations votes on the partition of Palestine

The following events occurred in November 1947:

== November 1, 1947 (Saturday) ==
- In the United States, the price cap on sugar was lifted at the stroke of midnight.
- An earthquake in the Peruvian Andes resulted in 233 deaths.
- Born: Nick Owen, television presenter and newsreader, in Berkhamsted, Hertfordshire, England
- Died: Man o' War, 30, American Thoroughbred champion race horse

== November 2, 1947 (Sunday) ==
- The Hughes H-4 Hercules, also known as the "Spruce Goose", had its one and only flight when Howard Hughes and a crew flew it for eight minutes. It is the largest flying boat ever built and has the largest wingspan of any aircraft in history.
- Bert Andrews publishes "A State Department Security Case" in the New York Herald-Tribune based on a secret transcript that sets off a series of Pulitzer Prize-winning articles on "Mr. Blank", one of ten State Department officials dismissed without specific charges over loyalty questions (Communism).
- The Toronto Maple Leafs and Chicago Black Hawks made a deal that was considered at the time to be the biggest trade in hockey history. The Leafs sent the entire "Flying Forts" line of Bud Poile, Gaye Stewart and Gus Bodnar along with defensemen Bob Goldham and Ernie Dickens to Chicago in exchange for 1946-47 scoring champion Max Bentley and prospect Cy Thomas.
- Died: Yamamoto Tatsuo, 91, Japanese politician

== November 3, 1947 (Monday) ==
- The Battle of Badgam was fought during the Indo-Pakistani War. One company of 4th Battalion, Kumaon Regiment was decimated but halted the momentum of the Pakistani attackers and gained time for Indian forces to fly in and save the Kashmir Valley.
- Sentences were handed down in the Pohl trial. Four defendants, including Oswald Pohl, were sentenced to death by hanging for war crimes. Three were acquitted and the remaining eleven received sentences of imprisonment for various lengths of time.
- Polish politician Stanisław Mikołajczyk reached London after escaping from Poland.
- Born: Shadoe Stevens, radio host and television personality, as Terry Ingstad in Jamestown, North Dakota
- Died: Som Nath Sharma, 24, Indian soldier and posthumous recipient of the Param Vir Chakra (killed in the Battle of Badgam); John Gilbert Winant, 58, American politician (suicide)

== November 4, 1947 (Tuesday) ==
- The US State Department published a 52-page booklet titled "Aspects of Current American Foreign Policy". The pamphlet blamed Russia's uncompromising attitude for the failure to secure world peace and acknowledged the possibility of Germany remaining permanently divided if the great powers could not reach an agreement.
- George S. Patton's wartime memoirs, War As I Knew It, were posthumously published.
- Died: Mabel Van Buren, 69, American stage and screen actress

== November 5, 1947 (Wednesday) ==
- The United Nations Political Committee voted to send a special UN commission to Korea to lead the nation toward political freedom. The Soviet bloc refused to participate in the vote, making it plain that the commission would only be allowed to operate in the US-controlled southern zone of Korea.
- The satirical play Invitation to the Castle by Jean Anouilh premiered at the Théâtre de l'Atelier in Paris.
- Born: Rubén Juárez, bandoneonist and singer-songwriter of tango music, in Ballesteros, Córdoba Province, Argentina (d. 2010)

== November 6, 1947 (Thursday) ==
- Soviet Foreign Minister Vyacheslav Molotov told an audience in Moscow that the secret of the atomic bomb "has long ceased to exist." Most American authorities took the statement to mean that Russia had learned the technique of making the bomb but did not necessarily have one.
- Five people died in three train crashes in London as thick fog enveloped the city.
- Canada formally invited Newfoundland to join the Dominion as a province.
- The first episode of the television news and interview program Meet the Press aired on NBC. It is the longest-running television program in US history.
- Born: Jim Rosenthal, television sports presenter, in Oxford, England

== November 7, 1947 (Friday) ==
- Italy, Austria and Hungary were admitted to UNESCO.
- The thirtieth anniversary of the October Revolution was observed. The traditional military parade through Moscow's Red Square was notable for a complete absence of foreign-made weapons or other equipment.
- Born: Yutaka Fukumoto, baseball player, in Osaka, Japan; Sondhi Limthongkul, media mogul and politician, in Sukhothai Province, Thailand
- Died: J. E. B. Seely, 1st Baron Mottistone, 79, British soldier and politician

== November 8, 1947 (Saturday) ==
- British Food Minister John Stratchey announced that starting November 10, sales of potatoes would be limited to 3 lb. per week per adult. Children under five would get 1½ lb. and expectant mothers 4½ lb. The announcement was the result of a shortage caused by the worst drought in 50 years.
- Born: Minnie Riperton, singer-songwriter, in Chicago, Illinois (d. 1979); Lewis Yocum, orthopedic surgeon, in Chicago (d. 2013)
- Died: Mariano Benlliure, 85, Spanish sculptor

== November 9, 1947 (Sunday) ==
- Former Prime Minister of Thailand Plaek Phibunsongkhram returned to power in a bloodless coup that overthrew the government of Thawan Thamrongnawasawat. Phibunsongkhram announced he would set up a coalition government "to save my country from ruin."
- Born: Phil Driscoll, trumpeter, singer, composer and producer, in Seattle, Washington

== November 10, 1947 (Monday) ==
- US Secretary of State George Marshall told Congress that the cost of preventing Communist domination of Europe was $597 million in immediate stopgap aid and another $16–20 billion over the next four years.
- The American military government in Germany announced a comprehensive new law designed to return property worth an estimated 13.5 billion marks to Jews and other victims of Nazi discrimination.
- The Court of Appeal of England and Wales decided Associated Provincial Picture Houses Ltd v Wednesbury Corp, setting conditions on which it would intervene to correct a bad administrative decision.
- The United States Supreme Court decided International Salt Co. v. United States.
- A wave of strikes sweeps France.
- Born: Glen Buxton, rock guitarist (Alice Cooper), in Akron, Ohio (d. 1997); Greg Lake, singer (King Crimson, Emerson, Lake & Palmer), in Poole, England (d. 2016)

== November 11, 1947 (Tuesday) ==
- A Romanian military tribunal found ex-prime minister Iuliu Maniu guilty of treason and sentenced him to solitary confinement for life. Eighteen associates of Maniu were also given prison sentences of varying severity.
- Professional wrestler Gorgeous George almost instantly became a celebrity when he made his first television appearance in a broadcast by KTLA from the Olympic Auditorium in Los Angeles.
- The drama film Gentleman's Agreement starring Gregory Peck and Dorothy McGuire premiered in New York City.

== November 12, 1947 (Wednesday) ==
- During a press conference, Charles de Gaulle called for an alliance of France, Britain and the United States to stem world communism and promote the reconstruction of Europe. Asked if he believed whether a Third World War was in the making, he replied: "It would be crazy not to look facts in the face and not to keep our eyes open to realities. A new war is a possibility. It is only a possibility, but we must face that possibility and prepare for it."
- In France, the communist-led general trade union federation called a general strike which would last, with varying degrees of success, until December 10.
- In Chicago, Jackie Robinson was presented with the first-ever Major League Baseball Rookie of the Year Award, initially known as the J. Louis Comiskey Memorial Award.
- Born: Buck Dharma, guitarist, songwriter and member of the rock band Blue Öyster Cult, as Donald Brian Roeser in Queens, New York City, New York

== November 13, 1947 (Thursday) ==
- Stafford Cripps became Chancellor of the Exchequer in the UK.
- Wataru Misaka made the roster of the New York Knicks to become the first person of color to play in modern professional basketball.
- Hans Hedtoft became Prime Minister of Denmark.
- The first episode of the TV game show Pantomime Quiz aired on KTLA in Los Angeles.
- Born: Joe Mantegna, actor, in Chicago, Illinois

== November 14, 1947 (Friday) ==
- The National Coal Board in Britain reached an agreement with unions to raise the pay of underground workers by 15 shillings a week and surface workers by 10 shillings. Basic wages were now £5 a week for underground workers and £4 for above-ground men.
- Jake LaMotta lost a boxing match to Billy Fox in four rounds. Suspecting the fight was fixed, the New York State Athletic Commission withheld the purses for the fight and suspended LaMotta.
- The Donald Duck story "Christmas on Bear Mountain" was published in Dell Comics Four Color #178 (cover date December 1947), featuring the first appearance of Scrooge McDuck.
- Born: P. J. O'Rourke, political satirist and journalist, in Toledo, Ohio (d. 2022)

== November 15, 1947 (Saturday) ==
- In Rome, an unexpected three-hour transportation strike suddenly started at noon at the instruction of the Communist-directed Chamber of Labor. Two workers were reported killed in fighting.
- A small blockade runner from France managed to land 182 Jewish refugees on the Palestinian shore near Nahariya. The passengers were all specially selected youth who disembarked and disappeared.
- Born: Steven G. Kellman, critic and academic, in Brooklyn, New York; Bill Richardson, American politician and diplomat, United States Ambassador to the United Nations, Pasadena, California (d. 2023)
- Died: Eduard Ritter von Schleich, 59, German World War I flying ace

== November 16, 1947 (Sunday) ==
- The Kadima, a refugee ship from Italy carrying 794 Jews to Palestine, was intercepted by the Royal Navy destroyer HMS Venus. The passengers would be taken to Cyprus.
- German composer Wilhelm Furtwängler was attacked by fifty former concentration camp inmates as he was entering the Musikverein in Vienna to conduct a concert. Despite having been cleared by all four occupying powers as well as the Austrian government during the denazification process, Furtwängler was booed and manhandled by the angry mob until a Russian guard fired into the air. A disruption inside the hall then delayed the concert for 45 minutes until the protestors were removed by Austrian police.
- Died: Joaquín Gallegos Lara, 38, Ecuadorian writer (complications from a fistula)

== November 17, 1947 (Monday) ==
- President Harry S. Truman asked Congress for the authority to reimpose price controls, rationing and wage controls to prevent national economic calamity.
- Six ammunition warehouses exploded at a US munitions depot in Yokohama, Japan. An American army officer and three Japanese workers were reported injured in the explosions that were heard as far away as Tokyo.
- Born: Inky Mark, Chinese-born Canadian politician, in Taishan

== November 18, 1947 (Tuesday) ==
- The Ballantyne's fire occurred in Christchurch, New Zealand when a fire engulfed Ballantynes department store. 41 people died in the blaze.
- The 31.31 carat Amati diamond, the 11th largest in the world and worth $100,000, was among the $200,000 in loot robbed at gunpoint from the ex-wife of the late newspaperman Damon Runyon in Dartmouth, Massachusetts.
- The first episode of the sitcom Mary Kay and Johnny aired on the DuMont Television Network.

== November 19, 1947 (Wednesday) ==
- Paul Ramadier resigned as Prime Minister of France under attack for failure to lessen the country's economic problems.
- King George VI awarded the Dukedom of Edinburgh to Lt. Philip Mountbatten and decreed that he would be known henceforth as "His Royal Highness", restoring the royal rank Philip had surrendered when he took British citizenship.
- Born: Bob Boone, baseball player and manager, in San Diego, California; Anfinn Kallsberg, politician, in Klaksvík, Faroe Islands (d. 2024); Lamar S. Smith, politician, in San Antonio, Texas

== November 20, 1947 (Thursday) ==
- Princess Elizabeth married Philip, Duke of Edinburgh in a ceremony at Westminster Abbey recorded and broadcast by BBC Radio to 200 million people around the world.
- Bob Elliott of the Boston Braves was named the Major League Baseball Most Valuable Player for the National League.
- Born: Nurlan Balgimbayev, 3rd Prime Minister of Kazakhstan, in Guryev, Kazakh SSR (d. 2015); Joe Walsh, musician and producer (Eagles), in Wichita, Kansas
- Died: Georg Kolbe, 70, German sculptor

== November 21, 1947 (Friday) ==
- President Truman appointed Omar Bradley to become Chief of Staff of the US Army upon General Eisenhower's retirement.
- Born: Nickolas Grace, actor, in West Kirby, Cheshire, England

== November 22, 1947 (Saturday) ==
- Ten days of communist-directed strikes and violence began to subside in Italy as the general strike in the Province of Bari was called off. 22 people had died in the fighting.
- Died: James J. Davis, 74, American politician and 2nd US Secretary of Labor

== November 23, 1947 (Sunday) ==
- The Republic of China (Taiwan) completed three days of voting for the National Assembly.
- The Convair XC-99 cargo plane flew for one hour and two minutes in its initial flight from San Diego's Lindbergh Field.

== November 24, 1947 (Monday) ==
- Robert Schuman became Prime Minister of France.
- The House Un-American Activities Committee declared a list of "unfriendly witnesses" who had refused to answer questions about alleged communist influence within the film industry. These witnesses would become known as the Hollywood Ten.
- The United States Supreme Court decided Cox v. United States, finding that courts have only limited scope of review over a Selective Service Board's classification of a Jehovah's Witness as a conscientious objector rather than a minister.
- Linotype printers of the International Typographical Union went on strike in Chicago. The city's six daily newspapers remained in production by switching over to photoengraving. The strike would last 22 months, making it one of the longest in history against a group of city newspapers.
- The novella The Pearl by John Steinbeck was published.
- Born: Dwight Schultz, actor and voice artist, in Baltimore, Maryland
- Died: Léon-Paul Fargue, 71, French poet and essayist

== November 25, 1947 (Tuesday) ==
- Another Big Four Conference began in London to discuss the future of Germany and Austria.
- The Parliament of New Zealand passed the Statute of Westminster Adoption Act 1947.
- Movie studio executives agreed to blacklist the Hollywood Ten.
- Born: John Larroquette, actor, in New Orleans, Louisiana

== November 26, 1947 (Wednesday) ==
- The London Conference ran into trouble early when Molotov assailed the western democracies as imperialist warmongers while Marshall replied that Molotov did not believe his own accusations.
- President Truman commuted the mail fraud sentence of Boston Mayor James Curley to the five months already served.

== November 27, 1947 (Thursday) ==
- A Douglas DC-3 of JAT Yugoslav Airlines crashed and burned two miles from Titograd while attempting to land in a snowstorm. All 22 aboard were killed.
- A Douglas-DC-3C of Columbia Air Cargo bound from Fairbanks, Alaska to Yakutat crashed into the trees while on approach. All 13 aboard perished.
- In one of the more historically controversial votes for the Major League Baseball Most Valuable Player Award, Joe DiMaggio of the New York Yankees won his third American League MVP award despite Ted Williams of the Boston Red Sox earning the league's Triple Crown that season.
- Born: Ismaïl Omar Guelleh, President of Djibouti, in Dire Dawa, Ethiopia

== November 28, 1947 (Friday) ==
- The last indictments in the Nuremberg Trials were filed. Thirteen generals and one admiral were charged with war crimes and crimes against humanity.
- Italy and Yugoslavia signed a five-year trade accord worth $250 million US.
- Died: Philippe Leclerc de Hauteclocque, 45, French general (plane crash in French Algeria); W. E. Lawrence, 51, American actor

== November 29, 1947 (Saturday) ==
- The UN General Assembly adopted a resolution recommending the adoption and implementation of the United Nations Partition Plan for Palestine.
- Mỹ Trạch massacre: The French army massacred 300 Vietnamese civilians in Mỹ Trạch village, Mỹ Thủy commune.
- The Toronto Argonauts edged the Winnipeg Blue Bombers 10-9 to win the 35th Grey Cup of Canadian football.
- Army defeated Navy 21-0 in the Army–Navy Game. A capacity crowd of 102,000 people were on hand at Philadelphia Municipal Stadium to watch the game, including President Truman.
- Born: Ronnie Montrose, guitarist (Montrose), in San Francisco, California (d. 2012)

== November 30, 1947 (Sunday) ==
- Jews in Tel Aviv celebrated the United Nations resolution by dancing in the streets during the early hours of the morning. World Zionist Organization President David Ben-Gurion called the establishment of a sovereign Jewish nation state in the ancient Jewish homeland an act of historical justice.
- Arab-Israeli Conflict begins. Arabs in Mandatory Palestine react to the United Nations resolution with protests and scattered violence. The Arab Higher Committee declares a strike and vows further action.
- In the Chinese Civil War, the Communists took the Manchurian railway center of Changtu.
- Born: Sergio Badilla Castillo, poet, in Valparaíso, Chile; Jude Ciccolella, actor, in Nassau County, New York; David Mamet, playwright, essayist and filmmaker, in Chicago, Illinois
- Died: Ernst Lubitsch, 55, German-born American filmmaker and actor
