= July 1947 =

Month of 1947

<<	July 1947					>>
Su	Mo	Tu	We	Th	Fr	Sa
		1	2	3	4	5
6	7	8	9	10	11	12
13	14	15	16	17	18	19
20	21	22	23	24	25	26
27	28	29	30	31

The following events occurred in July 1947:

== July 1, 1947 (Tuesday) ==
- The Summer Offensive of 1947 in Northeast China ended in Communist victory.
- Chiang Kai-shek ordered the general mobilization of Nationalist troops against the Communists.
- The United States launched the National Malaria Eradication Program.
- The Philippine Air Force was established.
- The inaugural draft of the Basketball Association of America (which later became the National Basketball Association) was held in Detroit. The Pittsburgh Ironmen selected Clifton McNeely of Texas Wesleyan University as the #1 overall pick, but McNeely would never play in the BAA, opting for a high school coaching career instead.

== July 2, 1947 (Wednesday) ==
- A conference in Paris between France, the UK and the USSR broke up after the Soviets rejected the Marshall Plan, which Britain and France accepted. Soviet Foreign Minister Vyacheslav Molotov warned that Europe would be split into eastern and western blocs if Britain and France acted alone; his UK counterpart Ernest Bevin declared that Britain had faced threats before and would not be deterred.
- The Polish Council for the Protection of Struggle and Martyrdom Sites and Auschwitz-Birkenau State Museum were established by Acts of Parliament.
- Born: Larry David, comedy writer, actor and television producer, in Brooklyn, New York
- Died: Richard R. Wright, 92, African-American military officer, educator, college president, civil rights advocate and banking entrepreneur

== July 3, 1947 (Thursday) ==
- Following Molotov's departure, Britain and France invited 22 nations to Paris for a new conference on implementing the Marshall Plan.
- Amir Sjarifuddin became 2nd Prime Minister of Indonesia.
- Born: Dave Barry, author and humor columnist, in Armonk, New York; Betty Buckley, actress and singer, in Big Spring, Texas

== July 4, 1947 (Friday) ==
- Albert Kesselring's death sentence was commuted to life imprisonment.
- Fred Daly won the Open Championship in Hoylake, England.
- The Technicolor musical comedy film The Perils of Pauline starring Betty Hutton as the silent film star Pearl White was released.
- Born: Morganna, entertainer known as the "Kissing Bandit", in Louisville, Kentucky

== July 5, 1947 (Saturday) ==
- Larry Doby became the second baseball player to break the color line when he made his major league debut with the Cleveland Indians, striking out in a pinch-hit appearance against the Chicago White Sox.
- Born: Joe Brown, lawyer, judge and arbiter of the television court show Judge Joe Brown, in Washington, D.C.

== July 6, 1947 (Sunday) ==
- The AK-47 assault rifle went into production in the Soviet Union.
- Spanish voters approved Franco's law of succession in a referendum, the first time the Spanish people had been allowed a chance to vote in 11 years. The result was reported as 95.1 percent in favor.
- Kingsblood Royal by Sinclair Lewis topped The New York Times Fiction Best Sellers list.
- Born: Richard Beckinsale, actor, in Carlton, Nottinghamshire, England (d. 1979); Larnelle Harris, gospel singer and songwriter, in Danville, Kentucky

== July 7, 1947 (Monday) ==
- Austria applied for UN membership.
- The Czechoslovak cabinet voted to accept Marshall Plan aid.

== July 8, 1947 (Tuesday) ==
- The Hostages Trial began in Nuremberg. Twelve German generals of the Balkan Campaign were put on trial as those responsible for the hostage-taking of civilians and the wanton shooting of those hostages, as well as executions of arbitrarily designated "partisans".
- Roswell UFO incident: an unidentified flying object crashed near Roswell, New Mexico. Although it was officially reported to be a conventional weather balloon, conspiracy theories persist that the downed object was an extraterrestrial spacecraft.
- American Communist leader Eugene Dennis was sentenced to a year in prison and fined $1,000 for refusing to testify before Congress.
- The American League defeated the National League 2–1 in the 14th Major League Baseball All-Star Game at Wrigley Field in Chicago. The first episode of Major League Baseball on NBC was aired in conjunction.
- Born: Bobby Sowell, rockabilly pianist and composer, in Memphis, Tennessee
- Died: William G. Bramham, 72, American baseball executive, lawyer and politician

== July 9, 1947 (Wednesday) ==
- King George VI announced the engagement of his daughter Princess Elizabeth to Lt. Philip Mountbatten.
- 2,500 alleged communist plotters were arrested in Athens.
- Born: Haruomi Hosono, electronic musician, in Minato, Tokyo, Japan; O. J. Simpson, American football player, broadcaster and actor, in San Francisco, California (d. 2024)

== July 10, 1947 (Thursday) ==
- Czechoslovakia withdrew from the Paris conference after initially agreeing to attend.
- Don Black of the Cleveland Indians pitched a 3-0 no-hitter against the Philadelphia Athletics.
- Born: Arlo Guthrie, folk singer-songwriter, on Coney Island, New York
- Died: Yitzchak Isaac Langner, 72, Galician Rabbi of Stratyn and New York

== July 11, 1947 (Friday) ==
- The SS Exodus departed Sète, France, loaded with 4,515 Jewish refugees bound for Palestine.
- The long poem The Age of Anxiety by W. H. Auden was published.

== July 12, 1947 (Saturday) ==
- Representatives of 16 nations opened a conference in Paris to discuss implementation of the Marshall Plan.
- Two British Army sergeants in Palestine were kidnapped in retaliation for death sentences imposed on three Irgun members convicted of leading the May 4 Acre Prison break.
- His Majesty King George VI graciously approved the addition of the prefix "Royal" to the following Corps of the New Zealand Army:
  - The Royal New Zealand Armoured Corps.
  - The Royal New Zealand Engineers.
  - The Royal New Zealand Corps of Signals.
  - The Royal New Zealand Infantry Corps.
  - The Royal New Zealand Army Service Corps.
  - The Royal New Zealand Army Medical Corps.
  - The Royal New Zealand Army Ordnance Corps.
  - The Royal New Zealand Electrical and Mechanical Engineers.
  - The Royal New Zealand Army Dental Corps.
  - The Royal New Zealand Chaplains Department.
- Born:
  - Loren Coleman, cryptozoologist, in Norfolk, Virginia
  - Wilko Johnson, English rock musician, as John Wilkinson in Canvey Island (d. 2022)
- Died: Jimmie Lunceford, 45, American jazz saxophonist and bandleader

== July 13, 1947 (Sunday) ==
- A Douglas DC-3 on a charter flight from New York to San Juan, Puerto Rico made an emergency crash landing in a swamp in Melbourne, Florida following engine trouble. 14 of the 36 aboard were killed.
- Cuban Labor Minister Carlos Prío Socarrás and Senator Eduardo Chibás fought a saber duel in the National Capitol in Havana. Chibás had been challenged to the duel by Socarrás after he harshly criticized the Labor Minister in a radio broadcast. Chibás sustained cuts to his face, left side and right arm while Socarrás was bruised in the right side.

== July 14, 1947 (Monday) ==
- British authorities in Palestine imposed martial law on Netanya, where the two British soldiers were kidnapped two days earlier.
- Tămădău Affair: A number of deputies of the National Peasants' Party in Romania were arrested at the Tămădău airport near Bucharest as they were waiting for airplanes to transport them out of the country. They would be charged with trying to overthrow the government.

== July 15, 1947 (Tuesday) ==
- A United Nations Security Council debate on a proposed international police force ended in a deadlock after the Americans and Soviets failed to agree on how much each of the participating states would be expected to contribute.
- Issue #1 of the comic book Young Romance (cover date Sept-Oct) was published. Created by Joe Simon and Jack Kirby, it is generally considered the first romance comic, and would run through 1975.
- India got its independence from british rule
- Born: Peter Banks, guitarist (Yes), in Barnet, London, England (d. 2013)
- Died: Walter Donaldson, 54, American songwriter; Brandon Hurst, 80, English stage and film actor

== July 16, 1947 (Wednesday) ==
- Hungarian Interior Minister László Rajk presented Parliament with a new electoral law containing several provisions beneficial to the Communists. Most significantly, the law extended the life of the Communist-dominated National Election Committee, which had the authority to decide which parties and candidates would be allowed to run.
- The House of Lords passed a bill with unprecedented speed when the Indian independence bill was rushed through three readings and a report stage all in the same day. The bill now only required Royal Assent to become law.

== July 17, 1947 (Thursday) ==
- 1947 Ramdas ship disaster: The Indian passenger ship SS Ramdas capsized ten miles off Colaba Point at Bombay, killing 625 people on board.
- 17-year-old Herbert E. Kolb, a Fred Harvey Company employee, lost his balance and fell 950 feet (290 m) to his death from the edge of Hopi Point in Grand Canyon National Park. The search for Kolb's body may have led to the discovery of uranium ore in the Grand Canyon.
- Born: Camilla, Queen of the United Kingdom; née Camilla Shand in London, England
- Died: Raoul Wallenberg, 34, Swedish architect, businessman, diplomat and politician (died under mysterious circumstances in Moscow prison)

== July 18, 1947 (Friday) ==
- The SS Exodus reached Haifa and fought British naval authorities for an hour and a half in an effort to stop them from boarding. The 4,515 Jews aboard were transferred to three waiting ships to be sent to Cyprus. 3 Jews died in the hospital.
- The Indian Independence Act 1947 received Royal Assent in the United Kingdom.
- The Trust Territory of the Pacific Islands was created by the United Nations and entrusted to the United States.
- President Truman signed a new Presidential Succession Act, changing the law of succession to the presidency. The Speaker of the House would succeed the president when there was no vice-president.
- The Detroit Tigers beat the visiting New York Yankees 8–0 to snap the Yankees' 19-game winning streak, which tied the American League record set by the Chicago White Sox in 1906.
- Born: Steve Mahoney, politician, in Sault Ste. Marie, Ontario, Canada

== July 19, 1947 (Saturday) ==
- Gunmen attacked a meeting of the Burmese Council in the Council Chamber in Rangoon. Among the ten killed was the premier, Aung San. This is commemorated as Martyrs' Day (Myanmar).
- The University of Illinois announced plans to begin large-scale manufacture of a tuberculosis vaccine known as BCG.
- Born: Bernie Leadon, country rock musician (The Flying Burrito Brothers, Eagles), in Minneapolis, Minnesota; Brian May, rock musician and astrophysicist best known as the guitarist of Queen, in Hampton, London, England
- Died: Aung San, 32, Premier of Burma (assassinated)

== July 20, 1947 (Sunday) ==
- After a gun battle, Burmese police in Rangoon arrested 20 leaders of the Myochit Party, including former prime minister U Saw, on charges of planning the previous day's murders.
- Born: Gerd Binnig, physicist and Nobel laureate, in Frankfurt, Germany; Carlos Santana, guitarist, in Autlán, Mexico

== July 21, 1947 (Monday) ==
- The Dutch, claiming violations of the Linggadjati Agreement, began what was termed a "police action" and launched Operation Product against the Republic of Indonesia to occupy large parts of Java and Sumatra.
- At 6 p.m. Pacific Time, 3,500 engineers of the Southern Pacific Railroad went on strike for higher pay and changes in working conditions. A compromise settlement was reached seven hours after the strike began.
- Born: Co Adriaanse, footballer and manager, in Amsterdam, Netherlands

== July 22, 1947 (Tuesday) ==
- The Hungarian Liberty Party dissolved in protest of the government restrictions on political activity and free speech.
- Born: Albert Brooks, actor, filmmaker and comedian, as Albert Lawrence Einstein in Beverly Hills, California; Don Henley, singer, songwriter and drummer (Eagles), in Gilmer, Texas

== July 23, 1947 (Wednesday) ==
- During Operation Product, Dutch forces captured the port city of Cirebon on Java.
- It was announced that American Federation of Musicians head James C. Petrillo had agreed to drop his ban on amateur radio broadcasting and record-making by high school and military bands, as long as the broadcasts and records were for the exclusive use of schools, colleges and universities.
- Born: Spencer Christian, television broadcaster, in Charles City, Virginia

== July 24, 1947 (Thursday) ==
- 20,000 people marched in Amsterdam to protest the war in Indonesia.
- A coal mine explosion in West Frankfort, Illinois killed 27 men.
- The comedy film The Bachelor and the Bobby-Soxer starring Cary Grant, Myrna Loy and Shirley Temple premiered in New York City.
- Born: Peter Serkin, pianist, in New York City (d. 2020)

== July 25, 1947 (Friday) ==
- Hungarian President Zoltán Tildy dissolved the National Assembly and called new elections for August 31.
- President Truman signed a joint resolution ending 60 wartime emergency laws and placing time limits on 124 others.
- Andrew J. May and Murray Garsson were given sentences of eight months to two years in federal prison for war bribes.
- Died: Kathleen Scott, 69, British sculptor

== July 26, 1947 (Saturday) ==
- France's National Assembly approved French participation in the Marshall Plan.
- The National Security Act of 1947 was enacted in the United States.
- 20-year-old student pilot Carl Lange, a United States Navy veteran of World War II, suffered a fatal skull fracture when he struck a power line while flying an Aeronca Champion aircraft and crashed in an Ohio hayfield. His instructor survived the crash. Stephen Koenig Armstrong and his sons, 16-year-old future astronaut Neil Armstrong and his brother Dean, were driving nearby and attempted to render assistance. According to some accounts, Lange died in Neil Armstrong's arms.
- Died: Martha Ellen Young Truman, 94, mother of US president Harry S. Truman

== July 27, 1947 (Sunday) ==
- Catherine Labouré and Louis de Montfort were canonized by Pope Pius XII.
- Born: Bob Klein, American football tight end, in South Gate, California; Kazuyoshi Miura, businessman, in Yamanashi Prefecture, Japan (d. 2008)
- Died: Ivan Regen, 78, Slovenian biologist

== July 28, 1947 (Monday) ==
- The Norwegian cargo ship Ocean Liberty exploded near the French port of Brest when a fire on board set off the cargo of ammonium nitrate, killing at least 26 people and injuring hundreds more.
- English swimmer Tom Blower completed the first swimming of the North Channel between Ireland and Scotland, achieving the feat in 15 hours and 26 minutes.

== July 29, 1947 (Tuesday) ==
- Dakota VT-CLA, a Douglas C-47 Skytrain carrying medical supplies to the national government of Indonesia, was shot down over Ngoto, Bantul with only one survivor of the nine aboard. The Dutch initially denied complicity but would eventually pay restitution.
- British authorities hanged three Irgunists for their part in the Acre Prison break.
- A record crowd of 82,500 packed into West Ham Stadium, London, to witness a speedway test match between England and Australia.
- Died: George Bausewine, 78, American baseball player and umpire; Leo Stein, 75, American art collector and critic

== July 30, 1947 (Wednesday) ==
- Dutch forces landed at Lubuk Pakam and occupied it.
- The British government suspended all military aid to the Netherlands.
- Born: William Atherton, actor, in Orange, Connecticut; Arnold Schwarzenegger, bodybuilder, actor and 38th Governor of California, in Thal, Styria, Austria
- Died: Joseph Cook, 86, Australian politician and 6th Prime Minister of Australia; Anton Lembede, 33, South African activist and founding president of the African National Congress Youth League

== July 31, 1947 (Thursday) ==
- The Sergeants affair: the bodies of the two British Army soldiers kidnapped on July 12 were found hanging from eucalyptus trees in Bnei Zion. Messages were pinned to their shirts saying they had been executed as spies. As one body was being taken down, a booby trap went off. Enraged British soldiers began a rampage in Tel Aviv, attacking civilians, looting and damaging shops. Five Jews were killed when a bus was fired upon.
- Born: Richard Griffiths, actor, in Thornaby-on-Tees, North Riding of Yorkshire, England (d. 2013); Joe Wilson, politician, in Charleston, South Carolina
