= June 1947 =

Month of 1947

<<	June 1947					>>
Su	Mo	Tu	We	Th	Fr	Sa
1	2	3	4	5	6	7
8	9	10	11	12	13	14
15	16	17	18	19	20	21
22	23	24	25	26	27	28
29	30

The following events occurred in June 1947:

== In the month of June ==
The June 1947 issue of the Bulletin of the Atomic Scientists featured the iconic Doomsday Clock showing 7 minutes to midnight.

== June 1, 1947 (Sunday) ==
- A tornado near Pine Bluff, Arkansas killed at least 37 people.
- Born: Jonathan Pryce, Welsh actor and singer, in Carmel, Flintshire; Ronnie Wood, English rock musician (Faces, The Rolling Stones), in Hillingdon, London

== June 2, 1947 (Monday) ==
- Emil Sandström was elected chairman of the United Nations Special Committee on Palestine.
- Smoke from a fire at a rubber dump in Mitcham, London, blotted out the sun in the area.
- The three-day Shelter Island Conference on quantum mechanics began in Shelter Island, New York.
- Born: Jarnail Singh Bhindranwale, Sikh theologian and leader of the Damdami Taksal, in Rode, Moga Punjab, British India (d. 1984)

== June 3, 1947 (Tuesday) ==
- In the House of Commons, British Prime Minister Clement Attlee announced the details of the plan to transfer power to India. Early reports from India suggested that the political leaders there had agreed to work with the plan.
- WDIV-TV, the first television station in Michigan, signed on in Detroit.

== June 4, 1947 (Wednesday) ==
- Scotland Yard disclosed that several prominent Britons had received letter bombs sent through the mail from Italy. None of the bombs had exploded, because the recipients all became suspicious of the bulky packets. Scotland Yard declined to reveal the names of those who had received the letters, but Edward Spears came forward to say that he was one of them and that the culprit was probably a Jewish underground organization.
- Born: Viktor Klima, Austrian businessman, politician and 21st Chancellor of Austria, in Schwechat

== June 5, 1947 (Thursday) ==
- Secretary of State George C. Marshall suggested in a speech at Harvard University that the United States would help Europe solve its economic problems provided the European countries themselves adopted a joint economic recovery program. This idea would become the basis of the Marshall Plan.
- Born: Laurie Anderson, US artist and musician, in Glen Ellyn, Illinois; Jojon, Indonesian comedian, in Karawang (d. 2014)

== June 6, 1947 (Friday) ==
- British postal workers intercepted nine more letter bombs reportedly addressed to Prime Minister Attlee, Winston Churchill and other prominent politicians.
- The Hessian Interior Ministry banned performances of military marches of the Wehrmacht in public. Numerous such incidents had recently occurred at fairs and similar events.
- Born: David Blunkett, politician, in Sheffield, England; Robert Englund, actor best known for playing Freddy Krueger in the Nightmare On Elm Street film series, in Glendale, California; Ada Kok, Olympic gold medalist swimmer, in Amsterdam, Netherlands
- Died: Władysław Raczkiewicz, 62, Polish politician and first president of the Polish government in exile

== June 7, 1947 (Saturday) ==
- The Spanish Cortes approved the Law of Succession, making Francisco Franco chief of state for life but allowing for the restoration of the monarchy after his death.
- FC Steaua București was founded in Romania.
- The film noir The Woman on the Beach, directed by Jean Renoir and starring Joan Bennett was released.
- "Mam'selle" by Art Lund hit #1 on the Billboard Best Sellers in Stores record chart.
- Born: Thurman Munson, baseball player, in Akron, Ohio (d. 1979)
- Died: Johnny Basham, 56 or 57, Welsh boxer

== June 8, 1947 (Sunday) ==
- A man in Genoa calling himself Ami Kam who described himself as a Stern Gang member told a reporter that he was the one behind the recent letter bomb plot, having personally sent the explosive packages to 24 prominent Britons including King George VI. He said that no more letter bombs would be sent now that the plot was well known, but added, "We now are going to work with other systems."
- Eva Perón was given a 21-gun salute on her arrival at Madrid, Spain.
- Born: Eric F. Wieschaus, developmental biologist and Nobel laureate, in South Bend, Indiana

== June 9, 1947 (Monday) ==
- Flooding of the Mississippi River left 23 dead and an estimated 22,000 homeless.
- Died: George S. Armstrong, 80, Canadian businessman and 11th Mayor of Edmonton, Alberta; J. Warren Kerrigan, 67, American silent film actor and director

== June 10, 1947 (Tuesday) ==
- Harry S. Truman began a state visit to Canada.
- Saab Automobile in Sweden unveiled the Ursaab.
- Born: Ken Singleton, baseball player, in New York City

== June 11, 1947 (Wednesday) ==
- The Siping Campaign began during the Chinese Civil War.
- Sugar rationing was lifted in the United States with the exception of industrial uses.
- Princess Elizabeth was given the Freedom of the City of London.
- The first Llangollen International Musical Eisteddfod opened in Wales. Despite rainy weather and a French railway strike, forty overseas groups arrived from fourteen countries to make the five-day festival a success.
- Died: Richard Hönigswald, 71, Hungarian philosopher

== June 12, 1947 (Thursday) ==
- Babe Zaharias became the first American to ever win the British Ladies Amateur Golf Championship.
- Died: Cosme Damião, former Portuguese football player and manager (mainly S.L. Benfica) in Sintra, Lisbon, Portugal.

== June 13, 1947 (Friday) ==
- Pennsylvania Central Airlines Flight 410: A Douglas DC-4 flying from Chicago to Norfolk, Virginia crashed into Lookout Rock in West Virginia's Blue Ridge Mountains, killing all 50 aboard.
- Boston's Fenway Park hosted its first night game. 34,510 turned out to watch the hometown Red Sox defeat the Chicago White Sox 5–3.
- Born: Annesley Malewana, Sri Lankan musician, in Ratnapura, Sri Lanka

== June 14, 1947 (Saturday) ==
- The play Life with Father set a new Broadway record for longest-running show with its 3,183rd consecutive performance.

== June 15, 1947 (Sunday) ==
- The Indian National Congress endorsed Jawaharlal Nehru's acceptance of the British plan to partition India.
- In the wake of the Pennsylvania Central Airlines disaster, President Truman appointed a five-man board of experts to study commercial air safety.
- Lew Worsham won the US Open golf tournament, defeating Sam Snead in an 18-hole playoff.
- Born: John Brisker, National Basketball Association player, in Detroit, Michigan (disappeared April 1978); John Hoagland, war photographer and photojournalist, in San Diego, California (d. 1984)

== June 16, 1947 (Monday) ==
- President Truman vetoed a bill calling for personal income tax cuts ranging from 10.5 to 30%, explaining that it would probably induce the "very recession we seek to avoid."
- Henry A. Wallace completed a nationwide speaking tour in Washington, D.C., with a speech urging a meeting between Truman and Stalin to counteract "the present suicidal course toward war and depression." He also indicated that he was ready to run as a third-party candidate in the 1948 election.
- The US Supreme Court refused to review Boston Mayor James Curley's conviction of mail fraud. Curley faced a prison term of 6 to 18 months.

== June 17, 1947 (Tuesday) ==
- President Truman's veto of the income tax reduction bill was upheld in the House of Representatives when the bill's supporters failed to get the two-thirds majority required to override the presidential veto.
- Born: Gregg Rolie, keyboardist and singer (Santana, Journey), in Seattle, Washington
- Died: Maxwell Perkins, 62, American literary editor

== June 18, 1947 (Wednesday) ==
- Ewell Blackwell of the Cincinnati Reds pitched a 6-0 no-hitter against the Boston Braves.
- Died: Shigematsu Sakaibara, 48, Japanese admiral (hanged for war crimes)

== June 19, 1947 (Thursday) ==
- Pan Am Flight 121, a Lockheed L-049 Constellation, crashed into the Syrian desert due to engine failure while flying from Karachi to Istanbul. 14 of the 36 aboard were killed. One of the survivors was Third Officer Gene Roddenberry, who helped rescue passengers from the wreckage.
- Born: Paula Koivuniemi, singer, in Seinäjoki, Finland; Salman Rushdie, author (The Satanic Verses), in Bombay, British India
- Died: Kōsō Abe, 55, Japanese admiral (hanged for war crimes)

== June 20, 1947 (Friday) ==
- The House of Representatives overrode President Truman's veto of the Taft-Hartley Labor Bill by a vote of 331–83.
- The Eros statue, having been removed from Piccadilly Circus for safekeeping during the war, was returned to its plinth.
- Born: Candy Clark, actress, in Norman, Oklahoma
- Died: Bugsy Siegel, 41, Jewish American mobster (murdered)

== June 21, 1947 (Saturday) ==
- At a press conference in Washington, President Truman accused the Russian army of helping the Communist minority in Hungary to force changes in the Hungarian government.
- "Peg o' My Heart" by The Harmonicats topped the Billboard Best Sellers in Stores record chart.
- Born: Meredith Baxter, actress and producer, in South Pasadena, California; Shirin Ebadi, lawyer, judge, human rights activist and Nobel laureate, in Hamadan, Iran; Michael Gross, actor, in Chicago, Illinois; Fernando Savater, philosopher, in San Sebastián, Spain
- On Maury Island there was a sighting of a UFO, the incident was known as "Maury Island hoax" or "Maury Island incident"

== June 22, 1947 (Sunday) ==
- Senate opponents of the Taft-Hartley Bill ended a 28-hour filibuster and agreed to allow a vote the following day.
- Born: Octavia E. Butler, science fiction writer, in Pasadena, California (d. 2006); David Lander, actor and musician, in Brooklyn (d. 2020); New York; Pete Maravich, basketball player, in Aliquippa, Pennsylvania (d. 1988); Jerry Rawlings, 1st President of the 4th Republic of Ghana, in Accra, Gold Coast (d. 2020)
- Died: Jim Tully, 61, American vagabond, pugilist and writer

== June 23, 1947 (Monday) ==
- The Labor Management Relations Act of 1947 went into effect in the United States when the Senate overrode President Truman's veto by a vote of 68–25.
- The United States Supreme Court decided Adamson v. California and SEC v. Chenery Corp.
- Born: Bryan Brown, actor, in Sydney, Australia
- Died: Hans Biebow, 44, German Nazi chief of administration of the Łódź Ghetto (executed by hanging)

== June 24, 1947 (Tuesday) ==
- Ernst Reuter became 1st Governing Mayor of West Berlin.
- Kenneth Arnold UFO sighting: Aviator Kenneth Arnold claimed to have seen nine unidentified flying objects flying past Mount Rainier, Washington.
- Died: Dharmananda Damodar Kosambi, 70, Indian Buddhist scholar and Pali language expert

== June 25, 1947 (Wednesday) ==
- The Boeing B-50 Superfortress had its first flight.
- The Diary of a Young Girl by Anne Frank was first published in the Netherlands.
- Born: Jimmie Walker, actor and comedian, in the Bronx, New York
- Died: Jimmy Doyle, 22, American welterweight boxer (died in hospital a few hours after being KO'd by Sugar Ray Robinson)

== June 26, 1947 (Thursday) ==
- President Truman vetoed another bill, a congressional wool price support bill whose tariff he claimed "would have an adverse effect on our international relations."
- Died: R. B. Bennett, 76, Canadian lawyer, businessman and 11th Prime Minister of Canada

== June 27, 1947 (Friday) ==
- Federal district court in Washington sentenced the accused Communist agent Gerhart Eisler to one year in jail and fined him $1,000 for contempt of Congress. Sixteen members of the Joint Anti-Fascist Committee, including novelist Howard Fast and theatrical producer Herman Shumlin, were also convicted for refusing to turn over organization records to the House Un-American Activities Committee.

== June 28, 1947 (Saturday) ==
- Douglas Chandler was convicted in Boston of 10 counts of treason for broadcasting Nazi propaganda during the war.
- "Chi-Baba, Chi-Baba (My Bambino Go to Sleep)" by Perry Como hit #1 on the Billboard Best Sellers in Stores record chart.
- Born: Mark Helprin, writer and political commentator, in Manhattan, New York

== June 29, 1947 (Sunday) ==
- The Chinese Supreme Court issued a warrant for the arrest of Communist Party leader Mao Zedong for organizing a popular uprising.
- Born: Richard Lewis, American comedian (Curb Your Enthusiasm), in Brooklyn (d. 2024); David Chiang, Hong Kong actor, director and producer, in Shanghai, China

== June 30, 1947 (Monday) ==
- A bill that would make Hawaii the 49th US state was adopted by the House of Representatives by a vote of 196–133.
- At St. Louis, the Mississippi River reached a 103-year high of 39.6 feet as parts of the Midwestern United States experienced the worst flooding since the Great Flood of 1844. An estimated 26,300 people in Nebraska, Iowa, Missouri and Illinois were left homeless.
