= September 1947 =

Month of 1947

<<	September 1947					>>
Su	Mo	Tu	We	Th	Fr	Sa
	1	2	3	4	5	6
7	8	9	10	11	12	13
14	15	16	17	18	19	20
21	22	23	24	25	26	27
28	29	30

The following events occurred in September 1947:

== September 1, 1947 (Monday) ==
- 31 people were killed in the Dugald rail accident in Dugald, Manitoba, Canada.
- The Federation of American Scientists marked the second anniversary of V-J Day by issuing a statement that read in part: "A strong science will enable us to fight poverty, disease and ignorance. It will also enable us to fight a war effectively. It will not give us national security ... Other nations will soon have atomic bombs. There is no adequate defense against atomic bombs. There will be no defense. Inescapably then, national security lies in world security and that can be attained only by international action. As a nation, we have not learned this lesson."
- Born: Al Green, politician, in New Orleans, Louisiana
- Died: Frederick Russell Burnham, 86, American scout and adventurer

== September 2, 1947 (Tuesday) ==
- The Inter-American Treaty of Reciprocal Assistance was signed by many countries of the Americas in Rio de Janeiro. US President Harry S. Truman addressed the final session of the conference, praising the treaty as a sign of fidelity to the United Nations.
- The London Evening Standard ran an editorial titled "It Is Not Too Late—Call Off the Games," expressing opposition to London hosting the 1948 Summer Olympics. "Sane opinion will marvel only at the colossal thickness of hide which permits its owners, at this time of crisis, to indulge in grandiose and luxurious schemes for an international weight-lifting and basketball jamboree," the editorial argued, going on to say that "a people which has had its housing program and food imports cut, and which is preparing for a winter battle of survival, may be forgiven for thinking that a full year of excessive preparations for the reception of an army of foreign athletes verges on the border of the excessive." An official from Britain's organizing committee for the Olympics replied that hundreds of thousands of Britons were looking forward to the games, and that preparations to insure their smooth running were limited to "the minimum arrangements necessary."
- Mariano Suárez became President of Ecuador when Carlos Mancheno Cajas was ousted after just ten days in power.

== September 3, 1947 (Wednesday) ==
- A British military court in Hamburg sentenced 14 former Gestapo officials to death for killing 50 Allied airmen who attempted to escape from a Silesian prison camp in 1944.
- Bill McCahan of the Philadelphia Athletics pitched a 3-– no-hitter against the Washington Senators.
- The children's picture book Goodnight Moon by Margaret Wise Brown with illustrations by Clement Hurd was published.
- Born: Kjell Magne Bondevik, 26th Prime Minister of Norway, in Molde, Norway; Gérard Houllier, French football manager, in Thérouanne, Pas-de-Calais. (d. 2020)

== September 4, 1947 (Thursday) ==
- The Greek government avoided a strike by 72,000 Athens civil service workers by agreeing to increase their wages by 20-50%.
- French Upper Volta, which had previously existed from 1919 to 1932, was reestablished by French colonial authorities.

== September 5, 1947 (Friday) ==
- The US and UK agreed to joint control of the Ruhr mines in occupied Germany.
- Australian Prime Minister Ben Chifley announced the sale of all of Australia's gold production to the UK. The move would help cash-strapped Britain to obtain dollars immediately in the United States. The 150,000 ounces (representing two months of production) already sold under the agreement were worth about $5 million AUD.
- Born: Buddy Miles, rock drummer, singer, composer and producer, in Omaha, Nebraska (d. 2008); Kiyoshi Takayama, yakuza boss, in Tsushima, Aichi, Japan

== September 6, 1947 (Saturday) ==
- Operation Sandy: The US Navy successfully fired a German V-2 rocket from the aircraft carrier Midway, marking the first time a missile had been launched from a ship at sea.
- The two-week Canadian National Exhibition ended in Toronto with a new total attendance record of 2.25 million.
- Miss Memphis Barbara Jo Walker was crowned Miss America 1947.
- Born: Jane Curtin, actress and comedian, in Cambridge, Massachusetts; Bruce Rioch, footballer and manager, in Aldershot, England; Jacob Rubinovitz, Polish-born Israeli robotics scientist, in Łódź

== September 7, 1947 (Sunday) ==
- Themistoklis Sofoulis became Prime Minister of Greece for the third time.
- The city of Moscow officially celebrated the 800th anniversary of its founding. Joseph Stalin made a radio address for the occasion in which he called Moscow a "model for the capitals of the world."

== September 8, 1947 (Monday) ==
- Jewish refugees aboard the SS Exodus disembarked at Hamburg and were settled in a displaced persons camp at Poppendorf under heavy military guard.
- Born: Benjamin Orr, rock bassist, singer and songwriter (the Cars), in Lakewood, Ohio (d. 2000)
- Died: Victor Horta, 86, Belgian Art Nouveau architect and designer

== September 9, 1947 (Tuesday) ==
- Ex-governor of Minnesota Harold Stassen announced his candidacy for the 1948 Republican presidential nomination.
- The first software bug was recorded, in the Harvard Mark II electromechanical computer. The glitch was quite literally a "bug", as the error was traced to a moth trapped in a relay, which was carefully removed and taped to the log book.
- Born: Freddy Weller, country music singer and songwriter, in Atlanta, Georgia
- Died: Ananda Coomaraswamy, 70, Ceylonese Tamil philosopher and metaphysician

== September 10, 1947 (Wednesday) ==
- Hasan Saka replaced Recep Peker as Prime Minister of Turkey.
- A military court in Kraków sentenced nine men to death and seven others to long prison terms for conducting espionage on behalf of the United States, Britain and the Polish government-in-exile. Four of the defendants were members of Stanisław Mikołajczyk's Polish People's Party.
- Died: Hatazō Adachi, 57, Japanese general (committed suicide in prison)

== September 11, 1947 (Thursday) ==
- During a trial run off the Copeland Islands, a crankcase explosion aboard the newly repaired passenger ship Reina del Pacifico killed 28 crew members and injured 23 others in one of the worst engineering disasters in maritime history.
- General Eisenhower seemingly ruled himself out of ever running for political office when he said during a visit to Columbia University that "any man who has spent most of his life in the military should not occupy any position in partisan politics, and I can only repeat what I have said many times before—I shall never seek any partisan political office." However, he did not specifically say he would refuse a nomination if drafted, only saying he would have no part in anything "artificial."

== September 12, 1947 (Friday) ==
- The 2nd Cannes Film Festival opened in France.
- The Oriental Insurance Company was founded in Bombay, India.
- Pittsburgh Pirates slugger Ralph Kiner became the first major league player to hit eight home runs in a span of four consecutive games when he hit two against the Boston Braves to go along with the four he hit during a doubleheader the previous day and the two he hit against the New York Giants on September 10. The record was previously held by Tony Lazzeri of the New York Yankees, who had hit seven homers in a four-game span in 1936.
- Died: Thor Philip Axel Jensen, 83, Danish entrepreneur

== September 13, 1947 (Saturday) ==
- Greek Parliament voted in favor of an unconditional amnesty for guerrillas who surrendered within the next 30 days.
- NBC stations voted unanimously to ban radio broadcasts of crime and mystery shows before 9:30 p.m. EST, to minimize the possibility they would be heard by children.

== September 14, 1947 (Sunday) ==
- The Communist-dominated Polish government renounced the Concordat of 1925 between the Catholic Church and the Second Polish Republic.
- Kansas Senator Arthur Capper said during a radio broadcast that unless General Eisenhower "takes himself out of the picture by some unequivocal statement, he will be a factor in the Republican convention at Philadelphia whether or not he is an announced candidate."
- Born: Sam Neill (died 2026), Northern Irish-born New Zealand actor, in Omagh
- Died: Arthur Grenfell Wauchope, 73, British soldier and colonial administrator

== September 15, 1947 (Monday) ==
- The Free Territory of Trieste came into existence as the Treaty of Peace with Italy came into general effect.
- The New York Yankees clinched the American League pennant when the Boston Red Sox were eliminated by losing the first game of a doubleheader to the Chicago White Sox, 6-3.
- Born: Kate Craig, video and performance artist, in Victoria, British Columbia, Canada (d. 2002); Theodore Long, professional wrestling personality, in Birmingham, Alabama
- Typhoon Kathleen

== September 16, 1947 (Tuesday) ==
- Oswaldo Aranha of Brazil was elected 2nd President of the United Nations General Assembly.
- The British government decided not to wait any longer to hammer out an Austrian peace treaty with the other three great powers and formally ended its state of war with Austria to permit commercial dealings.
- Carlos Julio Arosemena Tola became President of Ecuador.

== September 17, 1947 (Wednesday) ==
- James Forrestal was sworn in as US Defense Secretary.
- The Fort Lauderdale hurricane made landfall near New Orleans, Louisiana. By the time it dissipated on September 20 the hurricane would cause 51 direct fatalities and $110 million worth of damage.
- Born: Tessa Jowell, politician, née Tessa Palmer in London, England (d. 2018)
- Died: Maurice Fargues, 34, French underwater diver, while trying to set a new depth record

== September 18, 1947 (Thursday) ==
- The National Security Act of 1947 went into effect in the United States, merging the Department of War and the Department of the Navy into the National Military Establishment. It also created the Department of the Air Force, National Security Council and Central Intelligence Agency.
- Born: Russ Abbot, musician, comedian and actor, in Ellesmere Port, Cheshire, England
- Died: James Gordon Legge, 84, Australian general

== September 19, 1947 (Friday) ==
- The National Association of Broadcasters meeting in Atlantic City adopted a code which reduced broadcast advertising, banned dramatic presentation of "controversial issues" and set standards for treatment of certain topics including race, religion and marriage.
- Finland applied for membership in the United Nations.
- Born: Steve Bartlett, politician, in Los Angeles, California; Tanith Lee, science fiction, horror and fantasy author, in London, England (d. 2015)

== September 20, 1947 (Saturday) ==
- A Pan-American Douglas DC-4 airliner flying from Bermuda to New York City developed engine trouble over the Atlantic Ocean, skimmed the waves for 60 miles and then crashed and burned at Floyd Bennett Field. All 36 passengers and 5 crew aboard survived.
- The Medal "In Commemoration of the 800th Anniversary of Moscow" was established in the Soviet Union.
- "Near You" by Francis Craig and His Orchestra hit #1 on the Billboard Best Sellers in Stores record chart.
- Born: Göran Lagerberg, singer songwriter with rock group Tages
- Died: Fiorello La Guardia, 64, Mayor of New York City from 1934 to 1945 (pancreatic cancer); Jantina Tammes, 76, Dutch botanist and geneticist

== September 21, 1947 (Sunday) ==
- Palestine Arab Higher Committee spokesman Husayn al-Khalidi declared that a separate Arab state in a partitioned Palestine would not be economically or politically viable, predicting that partition would result in "border incidents everywhere" and could lead to a tragic "crusade between Jewry and Islam."
- Mohandas Gandhi wrote in his weekly paper Harijan that the Indian government should take action to "banish the English language as a cultural usurper as we successfully banished the political rule of the English usurper."
- Born: Don Felder, musician (Eagles), in Gainesville, Florida; Stephen King, author most associated with the horror genre, in Portland, Maine
- Died: Harry Carey, 69, American film actor

== September 22, 1947 (Monday) ==
- The 16-nation Marshall Plan conference in Paris ended.
- Representatives of nine European Communist parties (mostly from the Soviet bloc but also including France and Italy) met in the Polish resort town of Szklarska Poręba for a conference aimed at coordinating their activities more closely.
- An automated Douglas C-54 Skymaster transport plane flew from Newfoundland to London without human aid.
- The Brooklyn Dodgers clinched the National League pennant when the St. Louis Cardinals were eliminated by losing the second game of a doubleheader to the Chicago Cubs, 6-3.
- Born: Jo Beverley, English-born Canadian romance novelist, in Blackpool (d. 2016); Norma McCorvey, plaintiff in the landmark American lawsuit Roe v. Wade, in Simmesport, Louisiana (d. 2017)

== September 23, 1947 (Tuesday) ==
- President of Argentina Juan Perón, on the balcony of the Presidential Palace before a cheering crowd of 100,000, signed a statute giving women the right to vote.
- The UN General Assembly overrode Soviet objections to include the Greek question, Korean independence and the Italian peace treaty on its agenda.
- Jackie Robinson of the Dodgers was honored with "Jackie Robinson Day" at Ebbets Field. He and his wife Rachel were presented with a new Cadillac, a gold wristwatch, a television, an interracial goodwill plaque and cash gifts.
- Born: Mary Kay Place, actress, singer, director and screenwriter, in Tulsa, Oklahoma
- Died: Nikola Petkov, 54, Bulgarian politician (hanged for espionage)

== September 24, 1947 (Wednesday) ==
- The Geneva Trade Conference approved a General Agreement on Tariffs and Trade to govern trade relations until the International Trade Organization's charter could be adopted.
- Cyprus Airways was founded.
- The adventure film The Foxes of Harrow starring Rex Harrison and Maureen O'Hara was released.

== September 25, 1947 (Thursday) ==
- President Truman urged all Americans to conserve food in order to bring down prices and release supplies to Europe's hungry.
- The first Skyhook balloon was launched.
- Born: Cheryl Tiegs, model and fashion designer, in Breckenridge, Minnesota

== September 26, 1947 (Friday) ==
- UK Colonial Secretary Arthur Creech Jones announced Britain's intention to abandon its mandate over Palestine and pull out of all its military and government personnel at an early date, whether or not the United Nations reached a settlement agreeable to both Arabs and Jews.
- Captain Marvel Adventures #79 was published (cover date December 1947), marking the first appearance of the character Tawky Tawny.
- Born: Lynn Anderson, country music singer, in Grand Forks, North Dakota (d. 2015)
- Died: Hugh Lofting, 61, British author and creator of Doctor Dolittle

== September 27, 1947 (Saturday) ==
- The Communist conference in Szklarska Poręba concluded with the founding of Cominform, an official forum of the international communist movement succeeding the Comintern which had been dissolved in 1943.
- The Royal Navy intercepted the Jewish refugee ship Af Al Pi Chen which was sailing to Palestine from Italy with 434 passengers. 1 person was killed and 10 injured in the violent resistance during the boarding of the ship.
- Born:
  - Dick Advocaat, footballer and manager, in The Hague, Netherlands;
  - Meat Loaf, singer and actor, as Marvin Lee Aday in Dallas (d. 2022)

== September 28, 1947 (Sunday) ==
- B'nai B'rith sent a telegram to President Truman asking him to issue a statement in support of a United Nations committee majority recommendation that Palestine be partitioned into Jewish and Arab states.
- 37-year old baseball pitcher-turned-broadcaster Dizzy Dean came out of retirement to pitch one last game for the St. Louis Browns on the final day of the regular season as a publicity stunt. 15,910 people came out to watch Dean pitch four shutout innings against the Chicago White Sox and hit a single in his only plate appearance.
- Born: Sheikh Hasina, Prime Minister of Bangladesh, in Tungipara Upazila, Pakistan

== September 29, 1947 (Monday) ==
- The Einsatzgruppen trial began in Nuremberg. 24 officers of the Einsatzgruppen SS death squads went on trial for mass murder.
- In the UK, Stafford Cripps was given the newly created position of Minister for Economic Affairs.
- Coming off a disappointing third-place finish in 1947 after winning the pennant in 1946, the Boston Red Sox hired Joe McCarthy as the team's new manager. McCarthy had won seven championships as the manager of the New York Yankees.
- The stage play The Heiress by Ruth and Augustus Goetz premiered at the Biltmore Theatre on Broadway.

== September 30, 1947 (Tuesday) ==
- Argentina and Canada were elected to the United Nations Security Council.
- Game 1 of the 1947 World Series at Yankee Stadium was the first World Series game ever to be televised. The Yankees defeated the Dodgers 5-3 before a record crowd of 73,365.
- Born: Marc Bolan, rock musician, as Mark Feld in Stoke Newington, London, England (d. 1977); Rula Lenska, actress, in St Neots, Huntingdonshire, England
