= August 1947 =

Month of 1947

<<	August 1947					>>
Su	Mo	Tu	We	Th	Fr	Sa
					1	2
3	4	5	6	7	8	9
10	11	12	13	14	15	16
17	18	19	20	21	22	23
24	25	26	27	28	29	30
31

The following events occurred in August 1947:

== August 1, 1947 (Friday) ==
- Bulgarian leader Georgi Dimitrov and Yugoslav leader Josip Broz Tito signed the Bled agreement, an alliance treaty paving the way for future unification between the states in a new Balkan Federative Republic.
- Anti-British riots broke out in Tel Aviv during a funeral procession for the five Jews killed by British soldiers the previous day.
- Born: Lorna Goodison, poet, in Kingston, Jamaica

== August 2, 1947 (Saturday) ==
- A British South American Airways Avro Lancastrian airliner crashed into Mount Tupungato in the Argentine Andes during a flight from Buenos Aires to Santiago, killing all 11 aboard. Due to the remote location of the crash site and the effect of glacial ice, wreckage from the plane was not recovered until 1998.

== August 3, 1947 (Sunday) ==
- The Nicaraguan Constitutional Assembly election was held. Only Anastasio Somoza García's Nationalist Liberal Party ticket offered any candidates, and voter turnout appears to have been so low that official tallies were not even published.
- Born: Colleen Corby, model, in Wilkes-Barre, Pennsylvania
- Died: Vic Willis, 71, American baseball player

== August 4, 1947 (Monday) ==
- Argentina and Ireland established full diplomatic relations.
- The Technicolor comedy film The Secret Life of Walter Mitty starring Danny Kaye and Virginia Mayo was released.
- Born: Hubert Ingraham, two-time prime minister of the Bahamas, in Pine Ridge, the Bahamas

== August 5, 1947 (Tuesday) ==
- 35 Zionist leaders in Palestine were detained for terrorist activities.
- Australia formally joined the World Bank and International Monetary Fund.
- Dutch troops in Indonesia completed Operation Product, taking over large parts of Java and Sumatra from Republican forces.
- North Carolina Governor R. Gregg Cherry called the failure of a grand jury in Jackson, North Carolina to indict seven white men on charges of lynching an African-American a "miscarriage of justice" and said he would order the case reopened.
- Born: Rick Derringer, rock guitarist and singer, in Fort Recovery, Ohio (d. 2025)

== August 6, 1947 (Wednesday) ==
- The UK Treasury imposed a 75 percent customs duty on the value of imported films under the Import Duties Act 1932.
- Howard Hughes made his first appearance before a senatorial inquiry into wartime contracts and testified that committee chairman Owen Brewster had offered to kill the investigation if Hughes would agree to merge TWA with Pan-American Airlines, which Brewster had part interest in.
- Died: Alan Sullivan, 78, Canadian poet and short story author

== August 7, 1947 (Thursday) ==
- After 101 days and 4,300 miles (6,900 km), the raft of the Kon-Tiki expedition led by Thor Heyerdahl smashed into a reef at Raroia in the Tuamotus. Heyerdahl demonstrated that there were no technical reasons preventing South Americans of pre-Columbian times from settling Polynesia.
- The Bombay Municipal Corporation formally took over the Bombay Electric Supply and Transport (BEST).
- Born: Franciscus Henri, musician and children's entertainer, in The Hague, Netherlands

== August 8, 1947 (Friday) ==
- The British House of Commons on second reading passed a bill to give the Labour government sweeping powers to deal with Britain's economic crisis. Opposition leader Winston Churchill accused the government of seeking a "blank check for totalitarianism."
- Born: George Costigan, actor, in Portsmouth, England; José Cruz, baseball player, in Arroyo, Puerto Rico; Ken Dryden, ice hockey player and politician, in Hamilton, Ontario, Canada (d. 2025)
- Died: Anton Denikin, 74, Russian general

== August 9, 1947 (Saturday) ==
- The Motion Picture Association of America suspended all shipments of films to the UK in reaction to the new customs duty.
- "Smoke! Smoke! Smoke! (That Cigarette)" by Tex Williams hit #1 on the Billboard Best Sellers in Stores record chart.
- Born: John Varley, science fiction author, in Austin, Texas

== August 10, 1947 (Sunday) ==
- General Lucius D. Clay reported the release of the last 8 million German prisoners of war and the complete destruction or conversion of all armaments plants in the US-occupied zone. The United States became the first of the four occupying powers to release all of its German POWs.
- William Odom landed in Chicago after a record 73-hour solo flight around the world in the Reynolds Bombshell, a converted A-26 bomber.
- In Karachi, the Parliament of Pakistan met for the first time.
- Born: Ian Anderson, rock musician (Jethro Tull), in Dunfermline, Scotland; Drupi, pop-rock singer, as Giampiero Anelli in Pavia, Italy; Anwar Ibrahim, politician, in Bukit Mertajam, Penang, Malayan Union

== August 11, 1947 (Monday) ==
- Senator Homer S. Ferguson suddenly called a suspension of the senatorial inquiry into Howard Hughes' war contracts, reportedly due to the bad publicity it was generating. Hughes claimed that the move was a "vindication" of his conduct.
- Born: Diether Krebs, actor, cabaret artist and comedian, in Essen, Germany (d. 2000)
- Died: Harry Davis, 74, American baseball player

== August 12, 1947 (Tuesday) ==
- Huge fires raged in Lahore following a full day of arson, killings and other crimes on the eve of the announcement of how the Punjab boundary commission would partition the province. At least 100 people died in the violence.
- The Philadelphia Chewing Gum Corporation was formed.
- Born: William Hartston, chess player, in London, England

== August 13, 1947 (Wednesday) ==
- The two-day riot total in Lahore rose to over 200 dead.
- General Lucius D. Clay testified before the UN Palestine Inquiry Commission in Berlin that the German economy probably could not absorb many displaced persons without causing an increase in anti-Semitism.
- Born: John Stocker, voice actor, in Toronto, Canada
- Died: Iha Fuyū, 71, Japanese scholar; George Godfrey, 50, American heavyweight boxer

== August 14, 1947 (Thursday) ==
- The Buchenwald Trial ended. 22 of the 31 convicted staff members of Buchenwald concentration camp received death sentences, five were sentenced to life imprisonment, and the remaining four were given sentences of 10 to 20 years.
- The Dominion of Pakistan was formed when the Muslim majority region formed by the Partition of India gained independence.
- The Technicolor comedy film Life with Father starring William Powell, Irene Dunne and Elizabeth Taylor had its world premiere in Skowhegan, Maine, the same town where the original play had first been performed eight years earlier.
- Shortly before the stroke of midnight on the eve of India's independence, Jawaharlal Nehru delivered the famous Tryst with Destiny speech.
- Born: Maddy Prior, folk singer (Steeleye Span), in Blackpool, England; Danielle Steel, romance novelist, in New York City

== August 15, 1947 (Friday) ==
- India became an independent country. Jawaharlal Nehru became the nation's first prime minister and participated in the official raising of the Indian flag in New Delhi's War Memorial Square in front of half a million people.
- Liaquat Ali Khan took office as the 1st Prime Minister of Pakistan.
- GLEEP, Britain's first atomic reactor, started up at Harwell.
- Twenty nations of the Americas gathered in Petrópolis, Brazil to draft a new defense pact formalizing the Act of Chapultepec.
- Born: Rakhee Gulzar, actress, in Ranaghat, India

== August 16, 1947 (Saturday) ==
- Nikola Petkov was sentenced to death on charges of conspiracy against the Bulgarian government.
- Indian Prime Minister Nehru declared in a broadcast that it was "the first and sacred duty of this Government to restore peace and order in the country." Nehru warned that rioting must cease and that his government would spare no one who participated in disorders "whether he be Hindu, Muslim or Sikh."
- Born: Marc Messier, actor and filmmaker, in Granby, Quebec, Canada; Carol Moseley Braun, politician, in Chicago, Illinois

== August 17, 1947 (Sunday) ==
- Soviet authorities in Germany passed their own version of a law already adopted on the American side by declaring an amnesty for all Nazis except important party officials.
- Minister of Overseas France Marius Moutet announced that French India would become an establishment of five free cities within the French Union.
- Died: Wilhelm Uhde, 72, German art collector, dealer, author and critic

== August 18, 1947 (Monday) ==
- At least 147 people were killed and 5,000 injured in Cádiz, Spain, when munitions in a storage depot exploded for reasons that were never determined.
- The United Nations Security Council voted unanimously to admit Yemen and Pakistan to membership.
- The US government called the Petkov sentence a "gross miscarriage of justice" and called on the USSR to pressure the Bulgarian government to suspend the sentence pending review of the case.

== August 19, 1947 (Tuesday) ==
- A US offer to settle the Indonesian-Netherlands dispute was rejected by Indonesian representative Sutan Sjahrir, who renewed his demand that the UN Security Council set up an arbitration commission to settle the matter.
- Born: Terry Hoeppner, American college football coach, in Woodburn, Indiana (d. 2007); Gerard Schwarz, conductor and trumpeter, in Weehawken, New Jersey

== August 20, 1947 (Wednesday) ==
- The Doctors' trial ended in Nuremberg. Seven high-ranking medical officials of Nazi Germany, including Hitler's personal physician Karl Brandt, were sentenced to death for having been involved in human experimentation and other crimes against humanity.
- President Truman estimated in his annual mid-year review of the US budget that the government would end its 1948 fiscal year June 30 with a record surplus of $4.7 billion, which he asserted would be used to pay down the national debt and provide a reserve against emergencies.
- Died: Franz Cumont, 79, Belgian archaeologist and historian; Max Gaines, 53?, American comic book publisher and founder of EC Comics; James Harbord, 81, American general and President and Chairman of the Board of RCA

== August 21, 1947 (Thursday) ==
- Soviet UN delegate Andrei Gromyko vetoed the applications of Italy and Austria for UN membership, on the grounds that the Italian peace treaty had not yet been ratified and that treaty negotiations with Austria had not yet been started.
- Chile's Chamber of Deputies authorized the government to suspend civil liberties to deal with a wave of Communist-led strikes.
- Died: Theodore G. Bilbo, 69, American politician and white supremacist

== August 22, 1947 (Friday) ==
- In Cairo, 1 person was killed and 75 injured in clashes between police and 5,000 demonstrators protesting the United States' support for a Brazilian proposal in the UN Security Council to refer Egypt's demand for Britain to leave the Nile valley back to Britain and Egypt for direct negotiations.
- British transport ships with 4,500 refugees from the SS Exodus left Port de Bouc, France and sailed for Hamburg after the passengers refused to disembark.
- Born: Cindy Williams, actress (Laverne & Shirley), in Van Nuys, Los Angeles, California (d. 2023)

== August 23, 1947 (Saturday) ==
- Ecuadoran Defense Minister Carlos Mancheno Cajas overthrew President José María Velasco Ibarra and seized power in a bloodless coup.
- 24 people were killed in a suburb of Berlin in the Soviet zone when a train burst into flames. It was believed that sparks from the engine ignited reels of film in the carriage while the train was moving.
- Prominent American liberals marked the 20th anniversary of the Sacco-Vanzetti execution with a manifesto warning against all forms of tyranny. "The twenty years since that execution night in August 1927," the manifesto read, "have brought upon the world mass slaughter and human suffering on a scale staggering to human reason. In retrospect we now see that the fate of the good shoemaker and the poor fish peddler was an omen of this worldwide tragedy from which the human family has scarcely yet begun to emerge." Signers included Eleanor Roosevelt, Helen Gahagan Douglas and her husband Melvyn Douglas, Herbert H. Lehman and Robert Maynard Hutchins.
- Born: Willy Russell, dramatist, lyricist and composer, in Whiston, England

== August 24, 1947 (Sunday) ==
- European officials reported that a large part of the continent was experiencing its worst drought in ten years and that near-famine conditions would exist over the winter if rain did not fall soon. The situation was particularly serious in Germany, which was going through its worst drought in 50 years.
- In Scotland, the first Edinburgh International Festival opened at Usher Hall.
- Born: Roger De Vlaeminck, racing cyclist, in Eeklo, Belgium

== August 25, 1947 (Monday) ==
- A Douglas D-558-1 Skystreak set a new air speed record of 650.6 miles per hour (1,047.0 km/h) at the U.S. Army air base in Muroc, California.
- Died: Clark Wissler, 76, American anthropologist

== August 26, 1947 (Tuesday) ==
- Moscow rejected the American proposal that Nikola Petkov's death sentence be reviewed, calling it "interference" in Bulgarian affairs.
- Born: Nicolae Dobrin, footballer, in Pitești, Romania (d. 2007)

== August 27, 1947 (Wednesday) ==
- The IG Farben Trial began in Nuremberg. 24 IG Farben industrialists went on trial for their conduct in Nazi Germany.
- The British government ordered "siege economy" measures rationing food, motoring and foreign travel.
- Born: Barbara Bach, actress and model, as Barbara Goldbach in Queens, New York

== August 28, 1947 (Thursday) ==
- Kvitbjørn disaster: A Norwegian Air Lines Short Sandringham flying boat crashed into a mountain near Lødingen, Norway, killing all 35 aboard.
- Ecuador's new dictator Carlos Mancheno abolished the country's 1944 constitution and proclaimed himself president under the 1906 charter with sweeping powers of decree.
- In the Dutch town of Beek, 17,000 karats of cut diamonds worth $2.5 million US that had been taken by the Nazis from Dutch merchants during the occupation were returned to the Netherlands by a heavily armed US convoy.
- Born: Liza Wang, actress, in Chongming County, China

== August 29, 1947 (Friday) ==
- Konstantinos Tsaldaris became Prime Minister of Greece for the second time.
- Three British transports carrying SS Exodus refugees sailed on from Gibraltar to Hamburg when the passengers maintained their refusal to disembark.
- Born: Temple Grandin, professor of animal science and autism spokesperson, in Boston, Massachusetts
- Died: Manolete, 30, Spanish bullfighter (killed in the arena); Kōtarō Nakamura, 66, Japanese general

== August 30, 1947 (Saturday) ==
- About 90 people were killed and 60 injured in a movie theater fire in the Rueil district of Paris, France. Police said the blaze was caused by a wire in the second balcony that short-circuited.
- The Inter-American Defense Conference in Brazil concluded with the approval of a joint defense treaty for the entire Western hemisphere.
- Paul Mantz repeated as the winner of the Bendix Trophy air race, making his run at an average speed of 460.423 miles per hour (740.979 km/h).
- Born: Allan Rock, politician and diplomat, in Ottawa, Canada

== August 31, 1947 (Sunday) ==
- Parliamentary elections were held in Hungary. The Hungarian Communist Party gained 30 seats, having consolidated its power in the two years since the last election by using salami tactics. This was the last remotely competitive election in Hungary until 1990.
- Born: Ramón Castellano de Torres, artist, in Ceuta, Spain; Billy Marshall Stoneking, American-born Australian poet, playwright, filmmaker and teacher, in Orlando, Florida (d. 2016); Somchai Wongsawat, 26th prime minister of Thailand, in Chawang, Thailand
