= United Air Lines Flight 608 =

1947 aviation accident

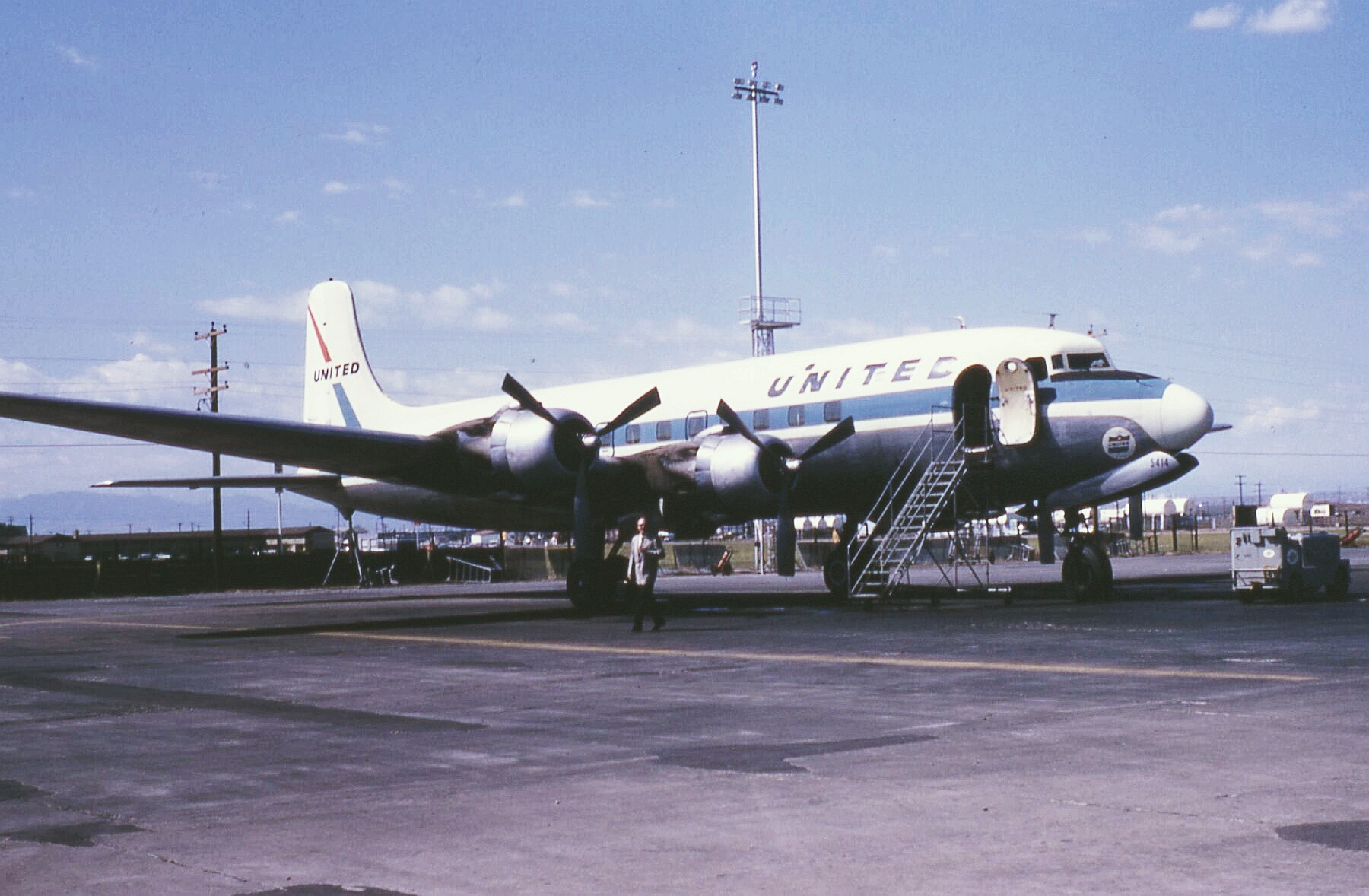
- A United Air Lines Douglas DC-6 similar to the one involved

Accident
- Date: October 24, 1947
- Summary: In-flight fire, design flaw
- Site: Bryce Canyon National Park, Garfield County, Utah, United States; 37°41′06″N 112°08′12″W

Aircraft
- Aircraft type: Douglas DC-6
- Operator: United Air Lines
- Call sign: UNITED 608
- Registration: NC37510
- Flight origin: Los Angeles International Airport, California, United States
- Destination: Chicago Midway Airport, Illinois, United States
- Occupants: 52
- Passengers: 47
- Crew: 5
- Fatalities: 52
- Survivors: 0

United Air Lines Flight 608 was a Douglas DC-6 airliner, registration NC37510, on a scheduled passenger flight from Los Angeles to Chicago when it crashed at 12:29 pm on October 24, 1947, about 1.5 miles (2.4 km) southeast of Bryce Canyon Airport, Utah, United States. All five crew members and 47 passengers on board were killed. It was the first crash of a DC-6, and at the time, it was the second-deadliest air crash in the United States, surpassed by Eastern Air Lines Flight 605 by only one fatality.

== Accident ==
United Air Lines Flight 608 departed from Los Angeles International Airport, California, at 10:23 am on a routine flight and climbed to 19,000 feet (FL190) to Chicago, Illinois. At 12:21 pm, the airplane's pilot, Captain Everett L. McMillen, radioed that a fire was in the baggage compartment, which they could not control, with smoke entering the passenger cabin. The flight requested an emergency clearance to Bryce Canyon Airport, Utah, which was granted.

As it descended, pieces of the airplane, including portions of the right wing, started to fall off, and one of the emergency flares on the wing ignited. At 12:27 pm, the last radio transmission was heard from the airplane: "We may make it – approaching a strip." Accounts from observers state the airplane passed over the canyon mesa, about 1,500 yards (1,400 m) from the airstrip. With gusts from the canyon floor flowing down the side of the mesa, the crippled aircraft, only 10 feet (3.0 m) off the ground, was pulled out of control and crashed.

Ground observers reported that occupants of the airliner, prior to the impact, were throwing various items out of the cabin door in an attempt to lighten the load as the DC-6 descended over the canyon. The airliner crashed onto National Park Service land, killing all 52 passengers and crew on board.

The October 25, 1947, edition of the Bridgeport Post reported:

Trailing smoke and flame for at least 22 miles [35 km] before it crashed, the giant ship plowed a smoke-blackened swath for 800 yards [730 m] alongside State Highway 22 [Johns Valley Road] just east of the Bryce Canyon airport. The scene is in southern Utah, about 275 miles [443 km] south of Salt Lake City.

The engines, scorched and twisted, were thrown 200 to 300 feet [61 to 91 m] beyond the burned area, while a piece of the tail – 18 to 30 feet [5.5 to 9.1 m] long – was the largest part of the aircraft remaining. The bodies, burned and unrecognizable for the most part, were horribly torn apart. Two infants and 21 or more women were among the victims, one of the women was an expectant mother. The mutilated remains were flung across the 7,300-foot [2,200 m] plateau or blown into the 200-foot [61 m] deep canyon just behind the impact point. All bodies were left at the scene until this morning, with guards posted to protect them from coyotes.

Pending an inquest, several groups of investigators started official probes today on the cause of the crash. One thing that was known, however, was that Capt. Everett L. MacMillen of Balboa Island, Calif., the pilot, reported by radio at 12:21 p.m. (MST), a few minutes before the incident that fire had broken out, probably in the airplane's baggage compartment, and that the cabin was filled with smoke. Five minutes later, the veteran of 18 years of flying on western routes opened his microphone and reported: 'The tail fire is going out. We may get down and we may not. Best place we can.'

At 12:27, he reported he had turned back for Bryce Canyon airport and said 'May make it. Think we have a chance now, Approaching the strip.' The next radio message came from the airport tower here at 12:32 p.m. It said, 'Fire one mile east.' The ship had gone down at that point.

== Cause ==
Just over three weeks later, on November 11, 1947, a similar in-flight incident almost claimed a second commercial DC-6 airliner.

An American Airlines DC-6 (NC90741), on a flight from San Francisco to Chicago with 25 crew and passengers aboard, reported an on-board fire over Arizona and managed to make an emergency landing in flames at the airport at Gallup, New Mexico. All 25 occupants escaped the burning plane, and the fire was extinguished. Unlike the Bryce Canyon crash a month earlier, investigators now had a damaged, but intact aircraft to examine and study.

The cause of both the Bryce Canyon crash and the near-fatal Gallup incident was eventually traced to a design flaw. A cabin heater intake scoop was positioned too close to the number 3 alternate fuel tank air vent. If flight crews allowed a fuel tank to be overfilled during a routine fuel transfer between wing tanks, it could lead to several gallons of excess fuel flowing out of the tank vent and then being sucked into the cabin heater system, which then ignited the fuel. This caused the fire that destroyed the United aircraft at Bryce Canyon and severely damaged the American aircraft that landed in flames at Gallup.

In the Bryce Canyon crash, the Civil Aeronautics Board found the causes to be the design flaw, inadequate training of the crew about the danger, and the failure of the crew to halt the fuel transfer before the tank overflowed.

== Aftermath ==
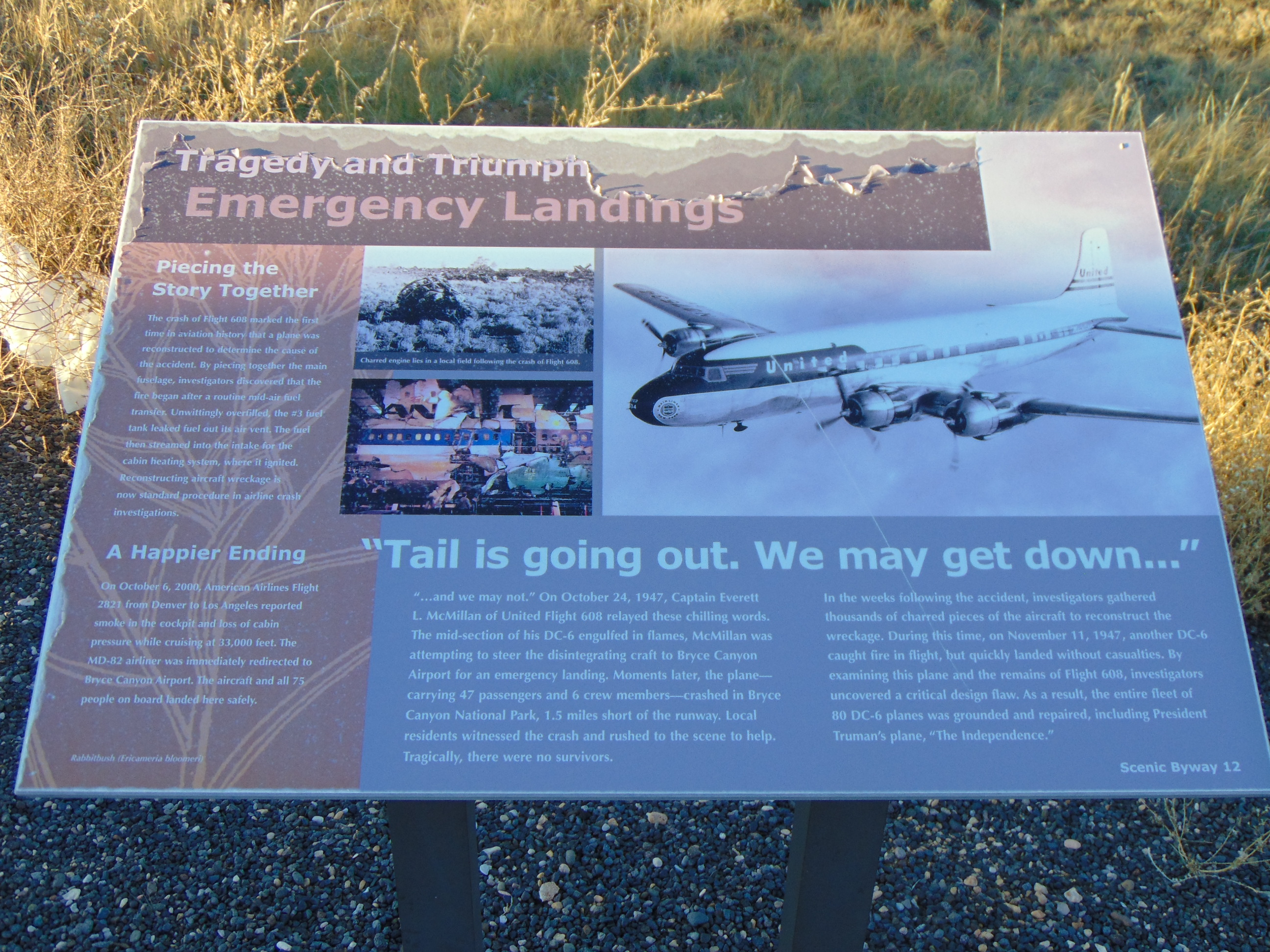
Sign on Utah State Route 12 discussing Flight 608 and American Airlines Flight 2821

The aircraft wreckage was loaded onto trucks and moved to Douglas Aircraft Company in California, where the airplane was reassembled in an effort to determine the cause of the accident.

As a result of the disaster, the entire fleet of 80 Douglas DC-6 aircraft, including the U.S. President's aircraft (which was a sister ship), were ordered grounded and recalled. Design changes that were made thereafter still stand today.

Chicago Cardinals player Jeff Burkett was among the passengers killed. Burkett, a rookie who led the National Football League in average yards per punt, took the flight on his own after the team's win over the Los Angeles Rams because he stayed in California to undergo appendicitis surgery. Teammate Babe Dimancheff was waiting to pick him up at Chicago Midway Airport. A moment of silence was held for the Cardinals' next game, where Ray Mallouf assumed punting duties. Charley Trippi became the Cardinals' punter afterward, which he admitted in 2009 was difficult because he would "always think about Jeff when I'd go back to punt." The Cardinals went on to win that's year's championship.

== See also ==
- Aviation safety
- List of accidents and incidents involving commercial aircraft
