= United Air Lines Flight 521 =

1947 aviation accident over the United States

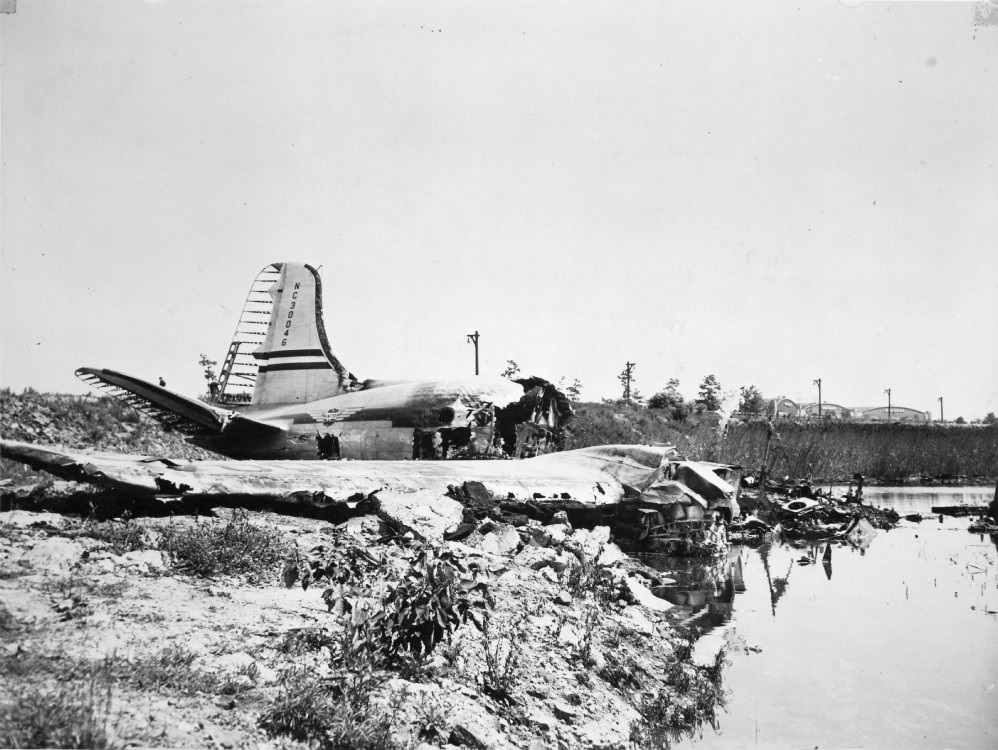
- The wreckage of Flight 521

Accident
- Date: May 29, 1947
- Summary: Pilot error
- Site: LaGuardia Airport, New York City, United States; 40.7683°N 73.8847°W

Aircraft
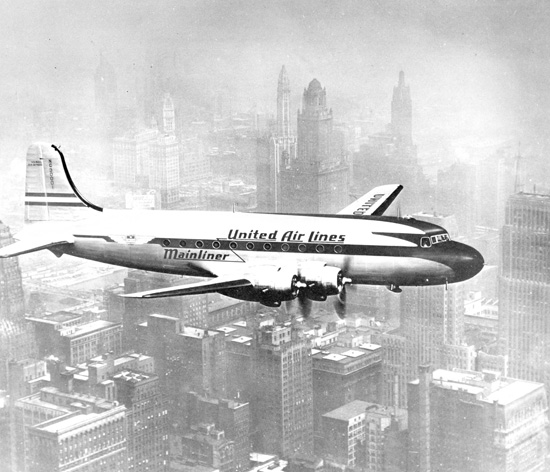
- A United Airlines Douglas DC-4, similar to the accident aircraft
- Aircraft type: Douglas DC-4
- Aircraft name: Mainliner Lake Tahoe
- Operator: United Air Lines
- IATA flight No.: UA521
- ICAO flight No.: UAL521
- Call sign: UNITED 521
- Registration: NC30046
- Flight origin: LaGuardia Airport, New York, United States
- Destination: Cleveland Municipal Airport, Cleveland, Ohio, United States
- Occupants: 48
- Passengers: 44
- Crew: 4
- Fatalities: 43
- Injuries: 5
- Survivors: 5

United Air Lines Flight 521 was a scheduled passenger flight operated by a Douglas DC-4 from LaGuardia Airport, New York City, United States, to Cleveland, Ohio, United States. On May 29, 1947, while attempting to take off on runway 18, the aircraft failed to get airborne, overran the end of the runway, ripped through an airport fence onto traffic on the Grand Central Parkway, and slammed into an embankment, ultimately plunging into a pond and exploding. Ten people escaped the flaming wreckage; only five of them survived.

It was the worst commercial aviation disaster in United States history at the time. Its record stood for less than 24 hours before an Eastern Air Lines DC-4 crashed near Baltimore, Maryland, killing all 53 aboard, an accident which the investigators for Flight 521 witnessed first-hand.

== Investigation ==
The Civil Aeronautics Board concluded the report on the accident by citing pilot error. The report read: "The Board determines that the probable cause of this accident was either the failure of the pilot to release the gust lock before take-off, or his decision to discontinue the take-off because of apprehension resulting from rapid use of a short runway under a possible calm wind condition."

Although the board came to the conclusion that pilot error was likely the cause, the May 31, 1947, edition of The New York Times told a different (albeit preliminary) tale:

"The United Air Lines DC-4 that crashed and burned at La Guardia Field Thursday night never got into the air and the pilot, after using up about two-thirds of the 3,500-foot runway, was trying to halt his giant craft by braking and ground looping. All night, on-the-scene inquiries by both the company and officials of the Civil Aeronautics Board established these facts yesterday. They agreed also that the wind shift, described by a company official as 'of almost unbelievable suddenness', led Capt. Benton R. Baldwin, the pilot, to decide against proceeding with the take-off, but they differed on whether the pilot had been apprised of approaching wind shifts before the take-off."

It seemed, at least early on, the cause may have actually been wind shear (although it is referred to as "wind shift" in the article).
