= Alain Mucchielli =

French physician

- Born: 3 October 1947 (age 78); Toulon (France)
- Citizenship: France
- Education: Lille (France), Nice
- Awards: Rolleston Award
- Scientific career
- Fields: Biochemistry, Public Health
- Workplaces: CEA, INSERM
- Theses: PhD: Evaluation toxicologique des produits formés au cours de l'irradiation gamma (cobalt 60) de l'amidon : influence sur la croissance et le métabolisme bactériens (1975); MD: Dynamics of antibody transfer from mother to fetus through the yolk-sac cells in the rat (1981)

Alain Mucchielli (born 3 October 1947 in Toulon) is a French biochemist and public health physician.

== Biography ==
In 1975, Mucchielli obtained a PhD with a thesis on food irradiation at the Lille Institut Pasteur in collaboration with the CEA Cadarache Research Centre. After joining the Institut National de la Santé et de la Recherche Médicale in 1977, his work focused on alpha-fetoprotein in Nice, France, and the trophoblast antigens in the Blond McIndoe Centre for Transplantation Biology, Queen Victoria Hospital, East Grinstead, England. In 1981, he obtained an MD with a thesis on antibody transfer from mother to fetus in the University of Nice.

In 1984, he engaged in street work. In 1987, along with seven other doctors, he co-founded a Red Cross Volunteer Centre for homeless people. Difficulties faced by people in this center committed him in harm reduction, and he organized in the early 1990s a medical care network for intravenous drug users.

This network supported about 500 drug users in the south of France from 1990 to 1997, and, since 1993, it provided substitution treatment for drug users suffering very difficult conditions.

In 1997, in Paris, he was "awarded the National Rolleston Award … for his advocacy of harm reduction in the face of opposition and doubt and for his efforts to bring about changes in Nice, a city badly affected by the problems arising from drug use and HIV". On 27 June 1998, he participated in the creation of the French Association for the Reduction of Drug-Related Harm, which brought together members who were involved in the majority of projects and actions in the field of harm reduction. Its initial ambition was to bring together, beyond the actors who were already involved, all those who were professionally concerned by the issue of drug use (police, justice, health, social, education, sport, culture, leisure) but also ordinary citizens, as well as their representatives.

After obtaining a speciality in Public Health, he was recruited in 1998 as Director of the Public Health Unit of the Mutualité Française des Alpes-Maritimes (which includes the SAMU Social in Nice). He then took on a regional management role in the Mutualité Française Provence-Alpes-Côte d'Azur.

== Sources ==
- L'héroïne, la cocaïne et le crack en France
