= Bryce Canyon Airport =

Airport in Garfield County, Utah

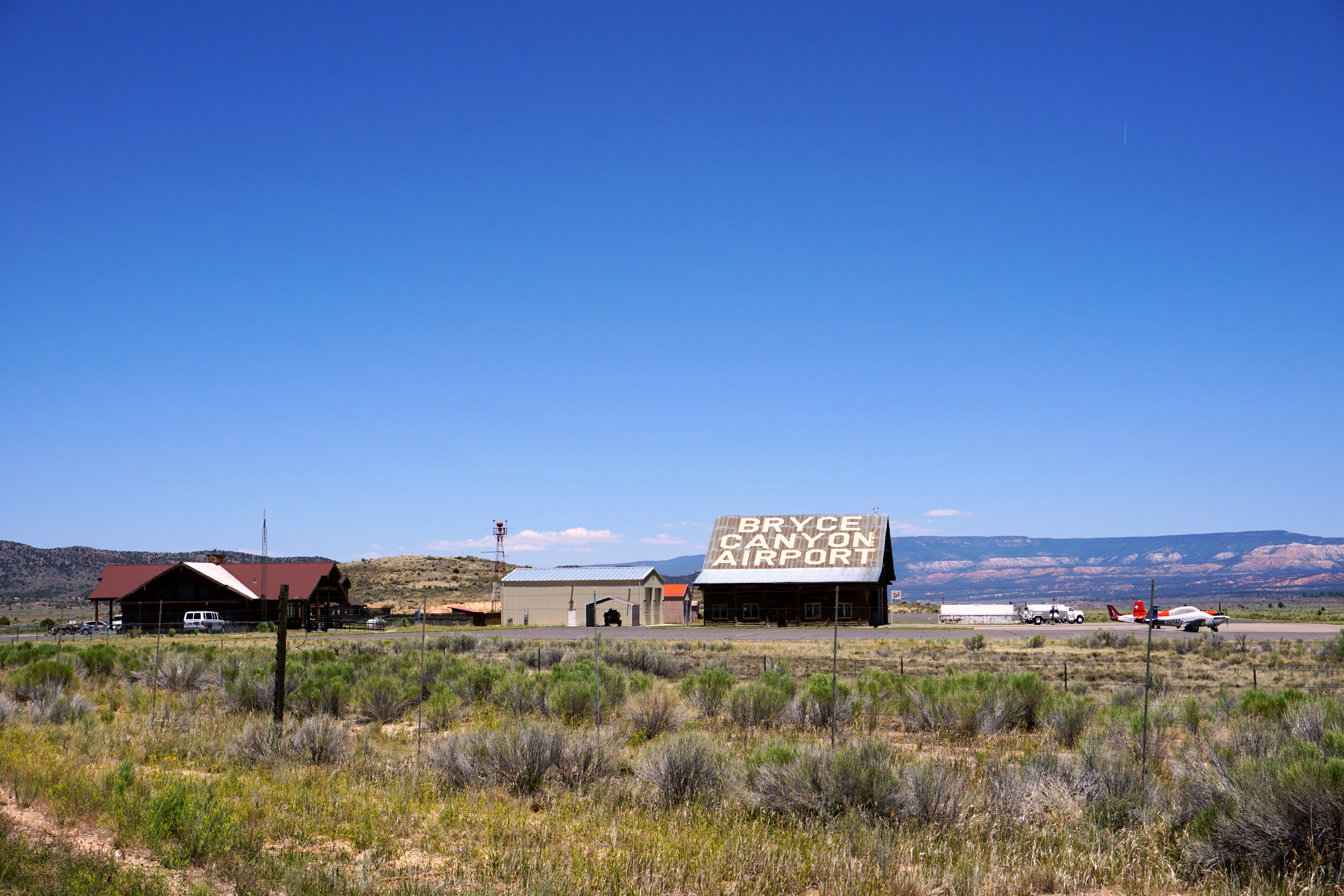
- IATA: BCE; ICAO: KBCE; FAA LID: BCE

Summary
- Airport type: Public
- Owner: Garfield County
- Serves: Bryce Canyon, Utah
- Elevation AMSL: 7,590 ft (2,310 m)
- Coordinates: 37°42′23″N 112°08′42″W
- Interactive map of Bryce Canyon Airport

Runways
Direction	Length		Surface
Direction	ft	m	Surface
3/21	7,395	2,254	Asphalt

Statistics (2023)
- Aircraft operations (year ending September 24, 2023): 2,189
- Source: Federal Aviation Administration

Bryce Canyon Airport (IATA: BCE, ICAO: KBCE, FAA LID: BCE) is a public-use airport located four miles (6 km) north of Bryce Canyon, in Garfield County, Utah, United States. It is owned by Garfield County.

The airport is near Bryce Canyon National Park and the Grand Staircase–Escalante National Monument.

== Facilities and aircraft ==
Bryce Canyon Airport covers an area of 215 acres (87 ha) which contains one asphalt paved runway (03/21) measuring 7,395 × 75 ft (2,254 × 23 m).

In the 12-month period ending September 24, 2023, the airport had 2,189 aircraft operations: 94% general aviation, and 6% air taxi.

== Charter airlines and destinations ==
- Air Grand Canyon (Prescott, South Rim Grand Canyon)
- Air Vegas (Las Vegas)
- Talon Air (Las Vegas)
- Grand Canyon Airlines
- King Air (Henderson)
- Westwind (Deer Valley, Page, Phoenix)

== Historic significance ==
The Garfield County Airport Hangar is significant as an unusual example of a log hangar. The hangar was built of local ponderosa pine by the Works Progress Administration in 1936. The hangar's gabled roof is supported sawn wood trusses spanning 83 feet (25 m). The trusses are expressed on the outside and infilled with half-rounds of log, giving a half timbered effect. The hangar and airport were built by Garfield County and the WPA with the aim of attracting tourism to Bryce Canyon National Park, which had been designated in 1928.

The timber used in the hangar shows the marks of the borers that infested the trees, which were harvested as part of a program to remove beetle-killed trees. The hangar is unique in its adaptation of local construction techniques to accommodate a new transportation technology.

Bryce Canyon Airport was listed on the National Register of Historic Places in 1978.

== Incidents ==
United Airlines Flight 608 a DC-6 (NC37510) was on a flight from Los Angeles to Chicago when it crashed at 12:29 pm on October 24, 1947 about 1.5 miles southeast of Bryce Canyon Airport, killing all 5 crew members and 47 passengers on board.

On October 6, 2000 American Airlines Flight 2821 departed Denver International Airport bound for Los Angeles International Airport. As the MD-82 aircraft was cruising at 33,000 ft (10,000 m), there was a report of smoke in the cockpit area and loss of cabin pressure. The airliner was immediately redirected to the Bryce Canyon airport in southwestern Utah. The single runway airport usually only handles small prop planes, but was built to handle larger aircraft in case of emergency for the long stretch flights between Denver and Las Vegas. American Airlines Flight 2821 and the 75 people on board landed safely at 8:45 am.

== See also ==
- List of airports in Utah
