= Eastern Air Lines Flight 605 =

1947 aviation accident

Coordinates: 39.614166°N 76.060632°W

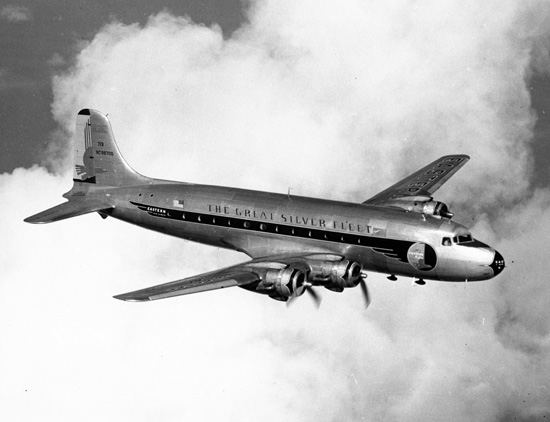
- A Douglas C-54 Skymaster similar to the accident aircraft

Accident
- Date: May 30, 1947
- Summary: Loss of control for reasons unknown
- Site: 1.9 miles east of Bainbridge, Maryland

Aircraft
- Aircraft type: Douglas C-54B Skymaster
- Operator: Eastern Air Lines
- Call sign: EASTERN 605
- Registration: NC88814
- Flight origin: Newark International Airport
- Destination: Miami International Airport
- Occupants: 53
- Passengers: 49
- Crew: 4
- Fatalities: 53
- Survivors: 0

Eastern Air Lines Flight 605 was a domestic flight in the US from Newark to Miami on May 30, 1947. The flight crashed near Bainbridge, Maryland, causing the deaths of all 53 passengers and crew on board in what was then the worst disaster in the history of North American commercial aviation.

== Accident flight ==
Flight 605 departed from Newark International Airport at 17:04 for a scheduled domestic flight to Miami. It climbed to its assigned cruising altitude of 4,000 feet (1,200 m). While flying over Philadelphia, the pilot reported "all is well". At 17:41, people on the ground saw Flight 605 enter a steepening dive and crash 2 miles (3 km) east of Bainbridge. All four crew and 49 passengers died in the crash. At the time, Flight 605 was the deadliest crash in United States aviation history. A number of Civil Aeronautics Board members were witnesses to the crash, flying back from La Guardia to investigate the crash of United Air Lines Flight 521, another DC-4, not even 24 hours ago.

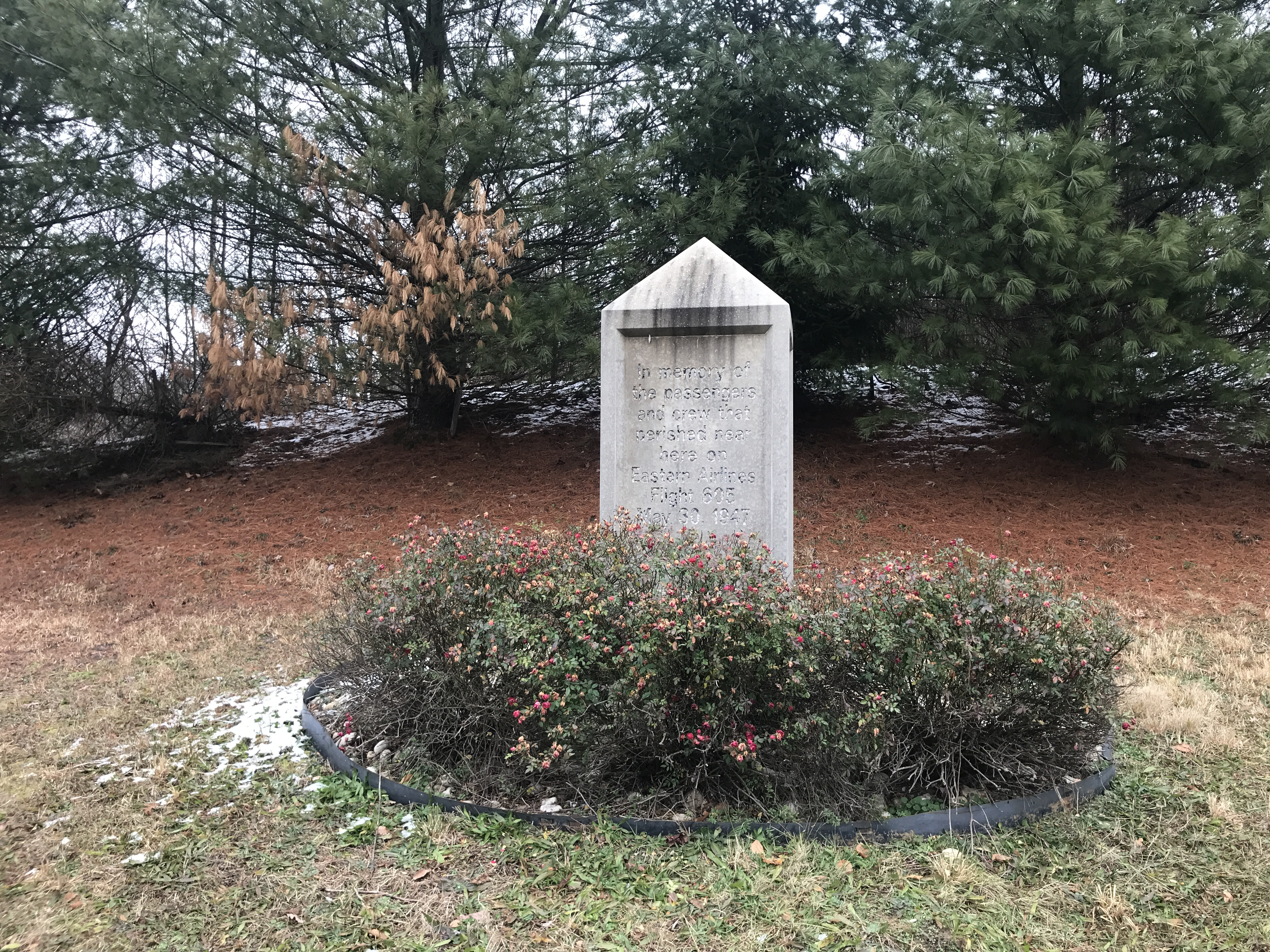
Monument erected at the crash site in Cecil County, Maryland (2022)

== Cause ==
The Civil Aviation Board's investigation of the crash determined that the probable cause of this accident was a sudden loss of control, for reasons unknown, resulting in a dive to the ground.

In his book Fate Is the Hunter, Ernest K. Gann suggests that the crash was caused by unporting of the elevators due to a missing hinge bolt, Gann having narrowly avoided a similar fate himself on the same day.

== Aircraft ==
The DC-4 aircraft, serial number 18380, was built in 1944 and was delivered officially as a C-54B Skymaster to the United States Army Air Force in October 1944. On the same day it was transferred with the designation R5D-2 to the United States Navy. It was leased to Eastern Air Lines on November 29, 1945 as fleet number 708.

== Memorial ==
Sixty-four years after the tragedy, about 30 people assembled on a hillside near the crash site to dedicate a memorial to the memory of those aboard Flight 605. Included in the assembly on August 14, 2011, were the son of a passenger, a Bainbridge Naval Training Center sailor who responded to the accident, and representatives of the Havre de Grace Police Department whose chief had been the first public safety official to arrive at the accident. Jeanette Nesbit Hillyer and the Stewart Companies, arranged for the placement of the memorial.
