= 1947 in aviation =

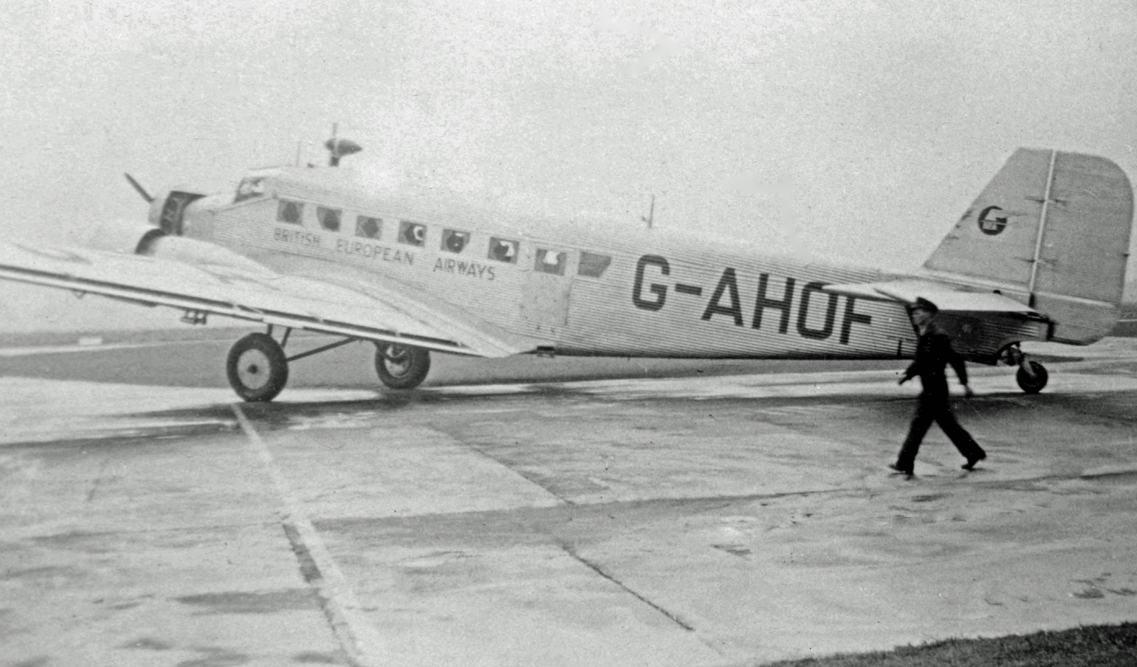
Junkers Ju52/3m of British European Airways at Manchester (Ringway) Airport in 1947

This is a list of aviation-related events from 1947:

== Events ==
- The United States' inventory of atomic bombs reaches a total of 13 weapons during the year.

=== January ===
- January 7 – Pioneering aviator Helen Richey is found dead at the age of 37 in her New York City apartment, apparently having committed suicide with an overdose of sleeping pills.
- January 8
  - A U.S. Joint Intelligence Committee report predicts that by 1956 the Soviet Union will have atomic bombs and strategic bombers capable of delivering them to the continental United States.
  - A U.K. Cabinet sub-committee approves High Explosive Research, a civil project to develop an independent British atomic bomb.
- January 11 – The BOAC Douglas C-47A G-AGJX crashes into a hill at Stowting in southeast England, killing eight of the 16 people on board and injuring all eight survivors. Among the injured is Member of Parliament Tom Horabin.
- January 14
  - The United States replaces the national insignia for its military aircraft adopted in September 1943 with a new marking consisting of a white star centered in a blue circle flanked by white rectangles bisected by a horizontal red stripe, with the entire insignia outlined in blue, which is still in use in the 21st century.
  - The U.S. Joint Intelligence Staff estimates that in the event of a war the Soviet Union could mobilize 15,000 combat aircraft.
- January 16 – The Burmese Air Force is founded.
- January 17 – The U.S. Joint Intelligence Committee notes that the Soviet Union maintains a peacetime deployment of 5,000 combat aircraft in Europe.
- January 25
  - A Spencer Airways Douglas Dakota crashes on takeoff into a parked and empty Czech Airlines Douglas C-47 Skytrain at Croydon Airport near London, England, killing 12 of the 23 people aboard the Spencer Airlines plane.
  - A Philippine plane crashes in Hong Kong, with $5 million worth of gold and money.
- January 26 – A KLM Douglas DC-3 Dakota crashes after take-off from Copenhagen, Denmark, killing all 22 on board, including Prince Gustaf Adolf, Duke of Västerbotten of Sweden, and American operatic soprano and musical theater and film actress Grace Moore.
- January 30 – Transcontinental and Western Air inaugurates history's first regularly scheduled all-cargo air service to operate over the North Atlantic Ocean.

=== February ===
- February 25 – The U.S. Joint Chiefs of Staff recommend that the United States use atomic bombs early in any war with the Soviet Union and call for an increase in the American inventory of atomic weapons.
- February 28 – In a single flight, U.S. Army Air Forces Captain Robert E. Thacker (pilot) and Lieutenant John M. Ard (co-pilot) in the North American P-82B Twin Mustang fighter Betty Jo make both the longest nonstop flight without aerial refueling by a fighter aircraft, about 4,968 statute miles (7,994 km) from Hickam Field in the Territory of Hawaii to La Guardia Field in New York City, and the fastest flight between Hawaii and New York City up to that time, 14 hours 31 minutes 50 seconds at an average speed of 342 mph (550 km/h). It remains both the longest non-stop flight by a piston-engined fighter and the fastest Hawaii-to-New York City flight by a piston-engined aircraft in history.

=== March ===
- March 3 – In Naval Strategic Planning Study 3, the Strategic Plans Division of the Office of the Chief of Naval Operations asserts that U.S. Navy aircraft carriers will be able to operate successfully against the coast of the Soviet Union in the face of substantial land-based Soviet air power, stating that the carriers are "the only weapon in the possession of the U.S. which can deliver early and effective attacks against Russian air power and selective shore objectives in the initial stages of a Russo-American conflict." The findings anger U.S. Air Force planners, who view strategic attacks against the Soviet Union as a strictly Air Force mission.
- March 5 – The 26th country ratifies the Convention on International Civil Aviation, permitting a permanent organization to replace the Provisional International Civil Aviation Organization (PICAO).
- March 14 – Saudi Arabian Airlines begins regular domestic services.
- March 16 – Saudi Arabian Airlines begins regular international services.
- March 21 – Aeropostal Alas de Venezuela (LAV) inaugurates its first service to the United States with a route between Caracas and Idlewild Airport in New York City, using Lockheed Constellations it had purchased earlier in the year.
- March 24 – Reeve Aleutian Airways is founded.

=== April ===
- April 1 – JAT Jugoslovenski Aerotransport commences operations as the flag carrier of the Socialist Federal Republic of Yugoslavia. It replaces Aeroput, Yugoslavia's first civilian airline and the flag carrier of the Kingdom of Yugoslavia from 1927 to April 1941, when the German invasion of Yugoslavia knocked it out of business and destroyed most of its property. Aeroput never resumes flight operations and will be dissolved in December 1948.
- April 4 – The International Civil Aviation Organization (ICAO) is formed under the terms of the Convention on International Civil Aviation, replacing the Provisional International Civil Aviation Organization (PICAO), which had operated since June 1945.
- April 12–16 – Piloting the Douglas A-26B Invader Reynolds Bombshell (NX67834), William P. "Bill" Odom sets an unofficial speed record for an around-the-world flight, completing it in 3 days, 6 hours, 55 minutes, 56 seconds. The Fédération Aéronautique Internationale (FAI) does not recognize the record.
- April 27 – A United Airlines Douglas DC-6 becomes the first DC-6 to be placed in overseas service when it flies from San Francisco, California, to Honolulu, Territory of Hawaii.

=== May ===
- The Royal Navy forms its first all-helicopter squadron, No. 705 Squadron, which serves as the Fleet Air Arm's Helicopter Fleet Requirements Unit at Gosport.
- May 1 – United Airlines begins daily scheduled service between San Francisco and Honolulu.
- May 2 – Swissair attempts its first flight to New York City, flying a Douglas DC-4 from Switzerland via Shannon Airport in Ireland and Stephenville in the Dominion of Newfoundland. Fog at New York City's LaGuardia Airport forces the airliner to divert to Washington, D.C., where it arrives 20 hours 55 minutes after departing Switzerland.
- May 15
  - The U.S. Joint War Planning Committee reports that the Soviet Air Force has 13,100 combat aircraft and that the Soviet satellite states have another 3,309, and that a month after the beginning of mobilization this could increase to 20,000 Soviet and 3,359 satellite state aircraft. It estimates that in an offensive in central Europe, the Soviet Union would employ 7,000 attack aircraft
  - The U.S. Civil Aeronautics Administration introduces its "Accelerated Service Test", which requires an airliner to undergo a rigorous 150-hour test that simulates one year of service in a week to 10 days of flying. A Martin 2-0-2 is the first airplane to undergo the test, visiting about 50 cities in seven days, with comprehensive inspections made of the aircraft's systems at each city to assess how wear or malfunction would occur.
- May 17 – Flying Eastern Airlines' first Lockheed L-749 Constellation on its delivery flight, Eastern pilot Dick Miller sets a new record time for a flight from Burbank, California, to Miami, Florida, of 6 hours, 54 minutes, 57 seconds.
- May 18
  - A Philippine Army Air Corps Douglas C-47 on its way to Paris to pick up Vice President of the Philippines Elpidio Quirino and bring him back to the Philippines crashes into the side of Mount Katanglad near Malaybalay, the Philippines, killing all 18 people on board.
  - During an air show in Burlington, Iowa, a United States Navy F4U Corsair fighter crashes into a sandlot baseball game near the municipal airport and catches fire, killing its pilot and two teenagers on the ground and injuring seven other people.
- May 28 – British South American Airways conducts trials of non-stop flights from London to Bermuda using aerial refueling over the Azores.
- May 29
  - A United States Army Air Forces Douglas C-54D Skymaster crashes on approach to Naval Air Station Atsugi, Japan, at the end of a flight from Kimpo Airport in Seoul, South Korea, killing all 41 people on board. It is the worst aviation accident in Japanese history at the time.
  - A Flugfélag Islands Douglas C-47A-25-DK on a domestic flight in Iceland from Reykjavík Airport in Reykjavík to Akureyri Airport in Akureyri flies into the side of Hestfjall Mountain at the side of Hédinsfjördur, killing all 25 people on board. The wreckage is found the following day.
  - The Douglas DC-4 Mainliner Lake Tahoe, operating as United Airlines Flight 521, fails to become airborne while attempting to take off from LaGuardia Airport in New York City, runs off the end of the runway, and slams into an embankment, killing 42 of the 48 people on board. It is the worst aviation disaster in American history at the time, although the death toll will be exceeded in a crash the following day.
- May 30 – During a flight from Newark, New Jersey, to Florida, an Eastern Air Lines DC-4 disintegrates in flight at an altitude of 6,000 feet (1,800 m) and crashes into a swamp near Baltimore, Maryland, killing all 53 people on board. It replaces the previous day's United Airlines crash as the deadliest airline accident in American history. Among the dead are two relatives of a man who had died the previous day in the United crash. The 97 deaths in the two crashes exceed the entire commercial aviation death toll in the United States for 1946.

=== June ===
- June 4 – Orient Airways, the first and only Muslim-owned airline in the British Raj, begins flight operations.
- June 17 – Pan American World Airways inaugurates what are considered the world's first scheduled commercial round-the-world flights, although the service actually operates between New York City and San Francisco without crossing the continental United States. Flight One, operated by a Douglas DC-4, departs San Francisco and stops at Honolulu, Hawaii; Midway Atoll; Wake Island; Guam; Manila, the Philippines; Bangkok; and Calcutta, where it meets Flight Two, a Lockheed Constellation that had flown from LaGuardia Airport in New York City. In Calcutta, the two aircraft swap flight designations; the DC-4 then turns back and continues as Flight Two to San Francisco, while the Constellation turns back and continues as Flight One, stopping at Karachi; Istanbul; London; Shannon, Ireland; and Gander, Newfoundland before arriving at LaGuardia Airport.
- June 19
  - Pan American Airways Flight 121, the Lockheed L-049 Constellation Clipper Eclipse (registration NC88845) carrying 36 people on a flight from Karachi Airport in Karachi, British India, to Istanbul-Yesilköy Airport in Istanbul, Turkey, feathers its number one propeller due to engine problems, then suffers overheating in its other three engines. As it descends, the number two engine nacelle catches fire and the engine detaches from the airliner, which makes a belly landing near Mayadin, Syria. Fourteen of the people on board die; it is the worst aviation accident in Syrian history at the time. Future Star Trek creator Gene Roddenberry is among the survivors.
  - United States Army Air Forces Colonel Albert Boyd sets a new official world airspeed record of 623.62 mph (1,003.62 km/h) in a Lockheed P-80 Shooting Star. (This is still marginally slower than unofficial German speed records in rocket-powered aircraft during World War II).
- June 22 – At the Wilson-King Sky Show in St. George, Utah, a light plane involved in the air show experiences brake failure on landing and crashes into cars parked at the edge of the airfield, killing a teenaged girl. The pilot and the dead girl's mother and infant sister are injured.
- June 24 – Kenneth Arnold UFO sighting: American businessman and aviator Kenneth Arnold is piloting a CallAir A-2 at about 9,200 feet (2,800 m) near Mineral, Washington (near Mount Rainier) when he sights what he reports to be a group of disc-like unidentified flying objects flying in a chain which he clocks at a minimum of 1,200 mph (1,900 km/h). He refers to them as looking like saucers, leading the press to coin the term "flying saucer", which soon enters everyday speech.
- June 30 – The Evaluation Board for Operation Crossroads submits its final report on the July 1946 atomic bomb tests at Bikini Atoll. It finds that an atomic attack could go beyond stopping a country's military effort and in addition wreck its economic and social structure for lengthy periods, and could even depopulate large portions of the earth's surface, threaten the existence of civilization, and cause the extinction of mankind. It recommends that the United States develop a large inventory of atomic weapons and the means to deliver them promptly and be prepared to strike first, with legal authority to launch a massive atomic strike to preempt a foreign strike if there are indications that an adversary is preparing one.

=== July ===
- July 3
  - The Philippine Air Force is formed.
  - United States Army Air Forces C-54G Skymaster 45-519 crashes in the Atlantic Ocean 294 miles (473 km) off Florida after loss of control caused by turbulence from a storm, killing the 6 crew.
- July 13 – A Burke Air Transport Douglas DC-3C (registration NC79024) operating a non-scheduled passenger flight from Daniel Field in Augusta, Georgia, to Miami International Airport in Miami, Florida, begins a gradual descent after suffering engine trouble, culminating in a crash-landing among trees and stumps outside of Melbourne, Florida. Fourteen of the 36 people on board die.
- July 15 – Northwest Airlines launches the first commercial passenger service from the U.S. to Asia's Far East along the North Pacific route with Douglas DC-4 The Manila, linking Minneapolis/St. Paul (USA) and Tokyo (Japan), Shanghai (China) and Manila (Philippines) by way of Edmonton (Canada) (technical stop), Anchorage (Alaska USA) and Shemya (USA) (technical stop). The Northwest Seattle—Anchorage service offered a connection (at Anchorage) with this new operation to the Orient. Seoul (South Korea) was included as a stop on the Northwest Airlines route to the Orient in August 1947.
- July 21 – An Argentine Air Force Douglas C-54A-1-DO Skymaster attempting to join a 200-plane flyover of Buenos Aires as part of a celebration of the birth of José de San Martín fails to gain altitude during takeoff from El Palomar Airport in El Palomar, Argentina. It runs through a crowd of spectators, crosses a railroad, and catches fire, killing 14 of the 19 people in board the aircraft and three people on the ground.
- July 26 – President of the United States Harry S. Truman signs the National Security Act of 1947, creating the United States Department of Defense. Among its many provisions is one which states that the soon-to-be established United States Air Force "shall include aviation forces both combat and service not otherwise assigned." This wording allows the U.S. Navy and U.S. Marine Corps to retain their aviation forces upon the establishment of the independent Air Force in September 1947.
- July 29 – In the Netherlands East Indies, the three surviving aircraft of the Indonesian Air Force bomb Dutch forces at Ambarawa, Salatiga, and Semarang, disproving the Dutch claim of having destroyed the entire Indonesian Air Force.
- July 31 – A Republic of China Air Force C-47 Skytrain crashes in China during a flight from Tihua to Lanzhou, killing all 26 people on board.

=== August ===
- Bad weather forces a U.S. Marine Corps pilot down in communist-controlled territory near Qingdao, China, during the Chinese Civil War. A landing party of U.S. Marines and U.S. Navy sailors destroys his plane to prevent its capture but fails to retrieve him, and the Chinese Communists return him to U.S. custody only after lengthy negotiations.
- August 2 – BSAA Star Dust accident: The British South American Airways Avro Lancastrian Star Dust (tail number G-AGWH) disappears over the Andes during a flight from Buenos Aires, Argentina, to Santiago, Chile, with the loss of all 11 people on board. Its wreckage finally will be discovered in glacial ice on Argentina's Tupungato mountain in 1998.
- August 3 – A Tushino air parade in Moscow in the Soviet Union presents the newest Soviet jets including the Yakovlev Yak-19, Lavochkin La-150, Lavochkin La-156, Lavochkin La-160, Sukhoi Su-9, and Sukhoi Su-11, among others. The Tupolev Tu-4 heavy bomber – a reverse-engineered copy of the Boeing B-29 Superfortress – also makes its first appearance, making Western analysts aware of its existence for the first time.
- August 4 – In an assessment of the defense of the Iberian Peninsula from Soviet invasion if Soviet forces reached the Pyrenees, the U.S. Joint Warfare Planning Committee reports that the Spanish Air Force has only 330 combat aircraft, all obsolete, and that the Portuguese Air Force is small and also obsolete, and that they would face about 1,000 Soviet aircraft. It finds that a defense of the peninsula at the Pyrenees would require the deployment of 739 ground-based combat aircraft and nine aircraft carriers to the area.
- August 5 – A wheel-well stowaway inside a KLM piston aircraft survives a flight from Lisbon, Portugal to Natal, Brazil.
- August 6 – A United States Navy PBY-5A Catalina amphibious flying boat carrying an Army-Navy American football team disappears during a flight from Kodiak, Alaska, to Dutch Harbor, Alaska. No wreckage or any sign of the 20 people on board is ever found.
- August 7–11 – Piloting the Douglas A-26B Invader Reynolds Bombshell (NX67834), William P. "Bill" Odom sets an unofficial speed record for an around-the-world flight for the second time in 1947, completing it in 3 days, 1 hour, 5 minutes, 11 seconds, beginning at Chicago, Illinois, and stopping at Gander in the Dominion of Newfoundland, Paris, Cairo, Calcutta, Tokyo, and Anchorage in the Territory of Alaska before returning to Chicago. The Fédération Aéronautique Internationale (FAI) again does not recognize the record.
- August 9
  - Douglas Aircraft ceases production of the Douglas DC-4.
  - Argentina's FMA I.Ae. 27 Pulqui I experimental jet makes its first flight. It is the first jet aircraft developed and manufactured in Latin America.
- August 10 – British European Airways (BEA) begins the world's first regular cargo-only airline service.
- August 15
  - The Royal Pakistan Air Force is formed.
  - Copa Airlines, the national airline of Panama, begins flight operations.
- August 20 – Flying the Douglas D-558-1 Skystreak, U.S. Navy Commander Turner F. Caldwell sets a new world air speed record of 640.796 mph (1,031.261 km/h) over Muroc, California, the first aircraft ever officially to exceed Heini Dittmar's October 2, 1941, unofficial record of 624 mph (1,004 km/h), set in a Messerschmitt Me 163A rocket fighter prototype.
- August 23
  - A British Overseas Airways Corporation Short S.25 Sandringham 6 (registration G-AHZB) flying boat is damaged beyond repair in a hard landing at Bahrain Marine Air Base in Bahrain at the end of a flight from Karachi, killing 10 of the 26 people on board.
  - The Avro Tudor 2 prototype, G-AGSU, crashes on take-off at Woodford, Greater Manchester, killing Avro chief designer Roy Chapman and test pilot S. A. Thorn.
- August 25 – Flying the Douglas Skystreak, United States Marine Corps Lieutenant Colonel Marion Carl achieves another world air speed record, reaching 650 mph (1,050 km/h).
- August 28 – The Norwegian Air Lines Short S.25 Sandringham 6 flying boat Kvitbjørn crashes into Kvammentinden mountain near Lødingen in Vesterålen, Norway, killing all 35 people on board. It is the deadliest aviation accident in Norwegian history at the time.
- August 29 – The U.S. Joint Warfare Planning Committee reports that in East Asia as of July 1 the Soviet Union has about 2,200 aircraft, increasing to 3,000 by 135 days after the start of war, opposed by 978 aircraft of the U.S. Army Air Forces in East Asia and the Territory of Alaska, 212 British and British Empire aircraft in the theater of war, and 480 operational Republic of China Air Force aircraft.

=== September ===
- September 6 – In an early test of the feasibility of fielding naval strategic missiles, the U.S. Navy aircraft carrier USS Midway (CV-41) launches a V-2 rocket off her flight deck while steaming in the Atlantic Ocean off Bermuda.
- September 17 – The United States Army Air Forces are separated from the United States Army and become an independent armed service, the United States Air Force.
- September 18 – The United States Department of the Air Force is created, and W. Stuart Symington becomes the first United States Secretary of the Air Force.
- September 19 – A United States Air Force Douglas C-54D-5-DC Skymaster crashes at Rio de Ocono, Peru, after an in-flight fire during a flight from El Alto Airport in La Paz, Bolivia, to Limatambo Airport in Lima, Peru, killing all 14 people on board.
- September 23 – The U.S. Joint Chiefs of Staff recommend that the United States Government pass legislation authorizing the United States Armed Forces to launch an atomic attack on the Soviet Union if one is required to prevent a Soviet atomic attack on the United States.
- September 24 – Cyprus Airways is founded. The flag carrier of Cyprus, it will begin flight operations in April 1948.
- September 26 – General Carl A. Spaatz becomes the first Chief of Staff of the United States Air Force.
- September 30 – The U.S. Joint Warfare Planning Committee reports that the Soviet Union lacks a strategic air force and poses no threat to the United States or Canada. It finds that the Soviets have about 100 heavy bombers that could reach Greenland and the Azores if Soviet ground forces captured forward bases for them in Norway and Spain, and about 100 medium bombers capable of striking Bear Island, Spitsbergen, Jan Mayen, Iceland, and the Faeroe Islands.

=== October ===
- The International Civil Aviation Organization (ICAO) becomes an agency of the United Nations linked to the United Nations Economic and Social Council (ECOSOC).
- The U.S. Joint Intelligence Committee predicts that the Soviet Union probably will have atomic bombs by 1951 or 1952, and that the major target for such weapons would be American atomic bomb plants and major American cities.
- October 1
  - Los Angeles Airways begins the first scheduled carriage of airmail by helicopter.
  - George Welch allegedly breaks the sound barrier during a dive in the North American XP-86. The claim remains disputed.
- October 8 – A modified de Havilland Mosquito launches an expendable, unmanned, rocket-powered 30-percent-scale model of the cancelled British Miles M.52 supersonic research aircraft at high altitude, planning for it to reach Mach 1.3 70 seconds after launch, but the model explodes just after launch. A second flight will take place in October 1948 and will be successful.
- October 14 – U.S. Air Force Captain Chuck Yeager takes the rocket-powered Bell X-1 past the speed of sound in the first controlled, supersonic, level flight. The flight, which achieves Mach 1.06, sets a new world air speed record of 807.2 mph (1,299.1 km/h). A few days later, the same aircraft sets a new world altitude record, reaching 21,372 meters (70,118 feet).
- October 16 – A Société Aérienne du Littoral Bristol Type 170 Freighter I (registration F-BCJN) flying from Marseille–Marignane Airport outside Marseille, France, to Oran Es Sénia Airport outside Es Sénia, French Algeria, crashes into the Mediterranean Sea off Cartagena, Spain, killing 41 of the 43 people on board.
- October 24 – United Airlines Flight 608, a DC-6 (NC37510) en route to Chicago from Los Angeles, catches fire and crashes while attempting an emergency landing at the Bryce Canyon, Utah, airport, killing all 52 people aboard. American professional football player Jeff Burkett is among the dead. It is the first crash of a DC-6 and the second-deadliest air crash in U.S. history at the time.
- October 26 – November 7 – Rhulin A. Thomas makes the first solo coast-to-coast flight by a deaf pilot. (Calbraith Perry Rodgers was an earlier deaf pilot who flew coast-to-coast in 1911, but was supported by a team on the ground.)
- October 28 – A Beechcraft Bonanza crashes in stormy weather southwest of Dog Lake in the Fremont National Forest near Bly, Oregon, killing all four people on board, including Governor of Oregon Earl Snell, Oregon Secretary of State Robert S. Farrell, Jr., and Oregon State Senate President Marshall E. Cornett.

=== November ===
- November 2 – With Howard Hughes at the controls, the Hughes H-4 Hercules, also known as the "Spruce Goose", makes its first flight, traveling at 135 mph (217 km/h) for about a mile (1.6 km) at an altitude of 70 feet (21 meters) over Long Beach Harbor in California with 32 people on board. Both the largest flying boat and the aircraft with the largest wingspan (319 feet 11 inches; 97.51 meters) ever built, it never flies again.
- November 28 – The B-25 Mitchell Tailly II crashes in French Algeria 60 kilometers (37 miles) north of Colomb-Béchar, killing all 13 people on board. French Army General Philippe Leclerc de Hauteclocque and his staff are among the dead.

=== December ===
- The U.S. Joint Chiefs of Staff note that the U.S. Air Force has 33 strategic bombers capable of dropping atomic bombs, and that this will rise to 120 bombers in November 1948. They also note that the number of atomic bomb assembly teams will rise to three by June 1948 and seven by July 1949; each bomb requires two days to assemble. They call for the production of 400 atomic bombs by January 1, 1953.
- A Southwest Airways Douglas DC-3 flying into the often fog-shrouded Arcata-Eureka Airport outside Arcata, California, makes the world's first blind landing by a scheduled commercial airliner, using ground-controlled approach radar, instrument landing system devices, and Fog Investigation and Dispersal Operations (FIDO) oil-burning units adjacent to the runway. By 1948, Southwest Airways airliners will have made 1,200 routine instrument landings at the airport.
- December 1 – The United States Marine Corps commissions its first helicopter squadron, Marine Experimental Helicopter Squadron 1 (HMX-1). It is based at Marine Corps Air Station Quantico, Virginia.
- December 17 – In the first Israeli combat action using an aircraft in the 1947–1949 Palestine war, pilot Pinchas Ben-Porat and a gunner from Beit Eshel remove the doors from an RWD 13 for an improvised machine gun and hand grenade attack on a Bedouin ground force assaulting Nevatim, successfully driving the raiders away.
- December 27 – An Air India Douglas C-48C-DO crashes into Korangi Creek shortly after takeoff from Karachi, Pakistan, killing all 23 people on board. It is the first fatal airline accident in Pakistan's history as an independent country.

== First flights ==
- Aeronca Sedan
- Beriev LL-143, early prototype of the Beriev Be-6 (NATO reporting name "Madge")
- Martin 3-0-3

=== January ===
- January 8 – Yakovlev Yak-19
- January 15 – Kaman K-125
- January 11 – McDonnell XF2H-1, prototype of the F2H Banshee

=== February ===
- February 12 – Sikorsky S-52

=== March ===
- Lavochkin La-156
- March 14 – Lockheed L-749 Constellation
- March 16 – Convair CV-240 Convairliner
- March 17 – North American XB-45, prototype of the North American B-45 Tornado

=== April ===
- April 1 – Blackburn Firecrest
- April 2 – Convair XB-46
- April 30 – Nord 2100 Norazur

=== May ===
- May 19 – Tupolev Tu-4 (NATO reporting name "Bull")
- May 28
  - Sukhoi Su-11 (1947), first aircraft with Soviet-designed jet engines
  - Douglas Skystreak
- May 30 – Boulton Paul Balliol

=== June ===
- Ilyushin Il-12 (NATO reporting name "Coach") with Aeroflot
- Lavochkin La-160, first Soviet swept-wing fighter
- Yakovlev Yak-15U, a prototype of Yak-17
- June 4 - Morane-Saulnier MS.600
- June 10 - Arsenal Air 100
- June 15 - SIPA S.901
- June 22 – Martin XB-48
- June 25 – Boeing B-50
- June 30
  - Avions Fairey Junior
  - Vickers Valetta VL249

=== July ===
- July – PTV-N-2 Gorgon IV, first ramjet-powered aircraft
- July 8 – Boeing 377 Stratocruiser
- July 8 – Yakovlev Yak-23
- July 10 – Airspeed Ambassador G-AGUA
- July 16 – Saunders-Roe SR.A/1 TG263
- July 21 – Aero 45
- July 24 – Ilyushin Il-22
- July 27
  - Tupolev Tu-12, first Soviet jet bomber
  - Bristol Sycamore, first British helicopter

=== August ===
- August 9 – FMA I.Ae. 27 Pulqui I
- Mid-August – Miles M.71 Merchantman
- August 22 – Miles M.68
- August 29 – Nord 1500 Noréclair
- August 31 – Antonov An-2 ("Colt")

=== September ===
- Hodek HK-101
- September 2 – Hawker P.1040 VP401
- September 14 – Praga E-112
- September 25 – Skyhook balloon

=== October ===
- October 1

North American XP-86, prototype of the F-86 Sabre, by George Welch
Beechcraft Model 34 Twin-Quad

- October 8 – Marinavia QR.14 Levriero
- October 10 – Arsenal O.101
- October 21 – Northrop YB-49 jet-powered flying wing
- October 24 – Grumman XJR2F-1, prototype of the UF-1, later HU-16, Albatross

=== November ===
- November 2 – Hughes H-4 Hercules ("Spruce Goose")
- November 2 – Yakovlev Yak-25 (1947)
- November 3 – Piper PA-15 Vagabond
- November 17 – Fairchild C-119 Flying Boxcar
- November 23 – Convair XC-99
- November 24 – Grumman XF9F-2, prototype of the F9F-2 Panther

=== December ===
- December 3 – Beriev Be-8 (NATO reporting name "Mole")
- December 17 – Boeing XB-47, prototype of the B-47 Stratojet
- December 30 – Mikoyan-Gurevich I-310, prototype of the MiG-15

== Entered service ==
- Aeronca Arrow
- Aeronca Sedan

=== March ===
- Lockheed P2V Neptune (later P-2 Neptune) with the United States Navy

=== April ===
- Douglas DC-6 with American Airlines

=== July ===
- Latécoère 631 with Air France

=== August ===
- McDonnell FH Phantom with United States Navy VF-17A

=== October ===
- October 13 – Martin 2-0-2 with Northwest Orient Airlines
- October 31 – Avro Tudor 4 with British South American Airways

=== November ===
- McDonnell FH Phantom with United States Marine Corps Marine Fighter Squadron 122 (VMF-122), first deployment of a jet by a U.S. Marine Corps combat unit
- Republic F-84B Thunderjet with the United States Air Force 14th Fighter Group.

== Retired ==
- Convair 110 by Convair
- Latécoère 611 by the French Navy

=== March ===
- Ryan FR Fireball by the United States Navy
