= 1948 in aviation =

This is a list of aviation-related events from 1948:

== Events ==
- Publication of Nevil Shute's novel No Highway set in the world of research into aviation safety.
- The United States Air Force has 20,800 aircraft, about half of them combat aircraft, down from 68,400 aircraft at the end of World War II in 1945. U.S. Air Force personnel strength stands at 387,000.
- The United States' inventory of atomic bombs reaches 50 weapons during the year. Each requires two days to assemble for use, and by mid-1948 the United States has only two bomb assembly teams.
- Faced with deep disagreement within the United States Armed Forces over their appropriate roles in national defense, United States Secretary of Defense James V. Forrestal orders Chief of Staff of the United States Army General Omar N. Bradley, Chief of Naval Operations Louis E. Denfield, and Chief of Staff of the United States Air Force General Carl A. Spaatz to meet at Key West, Florida, in March and at Newport, Rhode Island, in August to determine "who will do what with what." A proposal that the U.S. Air Force take responsibility for strategic air warfare and that the United States Navy "conduct...air operations necessary for the accomplishments of objectives in a naval campaign" and participate in an overall air campaign "as directed by the Joint Chiefs of Staff" fails when the Air Force insists on clear and exclusive control of the strategic role and the Navy refuses to agree.
- Under a contract with the Chinese Nationalist Air Force, Transocean Air Lines ferries 157 Curtiss C-46 Commando transport aircraft from California to Shanghai. Transocean refits each C-46 with additional fuel tanks to extend its range to 2,600 miles (2,300 nmi; 4,200 km) and flies it to China via Honolulu, Wake Island, Guam, and Okinawa.
- The Pitcairn Autogiro Company is dissolved.
- Summer – American intelligence analysts forecast that in 1957 the Soviet Union will have 15,000 combat aircraft.

=== January ===
- January 6 – An Air France Douglas DC-3D (registration F-BAXC) strikes trees during an approach in bad weather to Paris-Le Bourget Airport in Paris, France, and crashes in Gonesse, killing all 16 people on board.
- January 7 – Both engines of a Coastal Air Lines Douglas C-47A Skytrain (registration NC60331) shut down during a flight from Raleigh-Durham Airport in North Carolina to Miami, Florida. While the crew attempts to glide the aircraft to an emergency landing in a marsh, the aircraft stalls, crashes north-northeast of Savannah, Georgia, and breaks in two, killing 18 of the 27 people on board.
- January 11 – After a Dominicana de Aviación Douglas C-47 Skytrain (registration HI-6) carrying the B.B.C. Santiago baseball team home on a domestic flight in the Dominican Republic from Barahona to Santiago de los Caballeros encounters bad weather, its crew makes a navigational error while attempting to divert to Ciudad Trujillo. The aircraft crashes into a mountain near Yamasá, killing all 32 people on board.
- January 17 – BOAC begins to replace its Boeing 314 flying boats with the Lockheed Constellation on the Baltimore, Maryland-to-Bermuda route.
- January 20 – A China National Aviation Corporation (CNAC) Curtiss C-46 Commando evacuating people from Mukden, China, crashes while taking off from Mukden Airport in a snowstorm, killing 11 of the 54 people on board.
- January 28 – An Airline Transport Carriers Douglas C-47B Skytrain under contract to the U.S. Immigration and Naturalization Service crashes in the Diablo Mountains west of Coalinga, California, killing all 32 people on board. Among the dead are 28 Mexican migrant farm workers being deported to Mexico, leading singer-songwriter Woody Guthrie to write the protest song "Deportee (Plane Wreck at Los Gatos)".
- January 30
  - British South American Airways Avro Tudor IV Star Tiger (G-AHNP) en route from Santa Maria in the Azores to Bermuda disappears without trace with the loss of all 31 people on board. At last contact, the plane was estimated to be just under two hours away from Bermuda. Among those lost aboard the plane is retired Royal Air Force Air Marshal Arthur Coningham.
  - Orville Wright, co-inventor of the world's first practical fixed-wing aircraft, dies in Dayton, Ohio at the age of 76.

=== February ===
- Aerocar International begins design and development of a flying automobile designed by Moulton Taylor.
- Closed from 1941 to 1945 because of the German invasion of the Soviet Union during World War II and reopened in 1945 only to cargo and mail flights, Leningrad′s Shosseynaya Airport (the future Pulkovo Airport) finally reopens to scheduled passenger service.
- February 16 – A U.S. Joint Intelligence Committee study forecasts that by 1957 the Soviet Union will have the atomic bomb and a long-range strategic air force and will be able to inflict substantial damage on the United States with the use of atomic, chemical, and biological weapons.
- February 18 – The Spanish airline Aviaco is formed as an air freight company operating six Bristol 170s.
- February 29 – The Milton Reynolds-Boston Museum China Expedition, sponsored by Milton Reynolds, Life, and the Boston Museum of Science, leaves Chicago, Illinois, in the modified ex-United States Navy RY-1 Liberator Express executive transport aircraft The Explorer with planned stops at Palm Springs, San Francisco, Honolulu, Wake Island, Okinawa, and Tokyo before arriving in Shanghai, China. Personally leading the expedition, Reynolds plans to use the plane — equipped with radar, a height-measuring radio instrument, cameras, thermometers, and barometers and flown by record-setting pilot William P. "Bill" Odom — to carry a team of American and Chinese geologists, meteorologists, physicists, and photographers to explore China's Amne Machin mountain range and determine if reports are true that Amne Machin itself is taller than Mount Everest, as well as to search for the source of the Yellow River.

=== March ===
- The Israeli Air Force is formed along with the new state of Israel.
- The U.S. Joint Intelligence Committee forecasts that the Soviet Union will test its first atomic bomb sometime between 1950 and 1953 and by 1953 will have from 20 to 50 atomic bombs, depending on when it tests its first one.
- March 2 – A Sabena Douglas DC-3 (registration OO-AWH), crashes on approach to London Heathrow Airport in low visibility conditions, killing all 19 people on board.
- March 10 – Fighter Squadron 5 (VF-5) becomes the first United States Navy aircraft carrier squadron to be equipped with jet aircraft.
- March 12 – Northwest Airlines Flight 4422, a chartered Douglas C-54G-1-DO, crashes into Mount Sanford in the Territory of Alaska, killing all 30 people on board.
- March 19 – The British Overseas Airways Corporation (BOAC) extends its Hong Kong service to Japan.
- March 23 – Group Captain John Cunningham sets a new world altitude record of 59,446 ft (18,119 m) in a de Havilland Vampire.
- March 24 – A Boulton Paul P.108 Balliol becomes the first aircraft to fly with a single turboprop engine (an Armstrong Siddeley Mamba).
- March 28 – United States Air Force B-29 Superfortresses undergo aerial refueling tests, demonstrating the viability of this technique to extend the range of strategic bombers.
- March 31 – The modified ex-United States Navy RY-1 Liberator Express executive transport aircraft The Explorer, piloted by William P. "Bill" Odom and carrying the Milton Reynolds-Boston Museum China Expedition — which planned to explore China's Amne Machin mountain range and determine if reports are true that Amne Machin itself is taller than Mount Everest, as well as to search for the source of the Yellow River — suffers damage when it becomes mired in mud during a takeoff attempt at Peiping (now Beijing), China. The most recent of a series of delays, the accident prompts the expedition's leader, Milton Reynolds, to cancel the expedition.

=== April ===
- Two specially modified Gloster Meteors begin carrier trials aboard HMS Implacable.
- Pacific Ocean Airlines discontinues operations.
- The International Federation of Air Line Pilots' Associations is formed during a conference in London.
- April 2 – The modified ex-United States Navy RY-1 Liberator Express executive transport aircraft The Explorer, piloted by William P. "Bill" Odom — which originally had arrived in China to carry a scientific team on the Milton Reynolds-Boston Museum China Expedition — which planned to explore China's Amne Machin mountain range and determine if reports are true that Amne Machin itself is taller than Mount Everest, as well as to search for the source of the Yellow River but had been cancelled by its leader Milton Reynolds on March 31 — departs Shanghai, China, then returns to Shanghai 12 or 13 hours later. Reynolds explains that he had intended to begin a return flight to the United States via India but had turned around when he realized he and his crew lacked Indian visas. Angry Chinese scientists of the Academia Sinica immediately accuse him of violating an agreement with them by making a flight to explore Amne Machin on his own and without their permission, leaving some of the expedition's original team stranded in Peiping (now Beijing) and Lanchow (now Lanzhou). The government of the Republic of China impounds the plane.
- April 3 – Alitalia launches its first postwar service from Italy (Rome-Ciampino) to the United Kingdom (London's Northolt Aerodrome).
- April 4 – The troubled Milton Reynolds-Boston Museum China Expedition comes to an unsuccessful but dramatic end as its RY-1 Liberator Express The Explorer arrives at Haneda Airport in Tokyo after an unauthorized 12-hour flight from Shanghai. Expedition leader Milton Reynolds claims that he and the plane's three-man crew had tricked Chinese guards into letting them board the impounded plane by promising them ballpoint pens (an expensive commodity at the time), and that Reynolds had tossed about 50 pens out the door to the Chinese, then slammed the door as pilot Bill Odom taxied for takeoff. Fearing interception by Republic of China Air Force fighters, the men had flown the plane at an altitude of about 20 feet (6.1 m) for the first 350 miles (560 km) of the flight. The men had ignored orders from Haneda Airport to return to Shanghai, and Reynolds accuses Chinese officials of demanding bribes to allow The Explorer to take off after the failure of the expedition.
- April 5 – A Soviet Air Force Yakovlev Yak-3 fighter harassing aircraft flying into West Berlin during the Berlin Blockade collides with a British European Airways Vickers VC.1B Viking airliner as it is levelling off to land at RAF Gatow in West Berlin. Both aircraft crash, killing the fighter pilot and all 14 people aboard the airliner and leading to a diplomatic standoff between the Soviet Union and the United Kingdom and United States.
- April 6 – Seventeen hijackers commandeer a CSA Czech Airlines airliner carrying a total of 26 people during a domestic flight in Czechoslovakia from Prague to Bratislava. They force it to take them to Neubiberg Air Base in the American Occupation Zone in Allied-occupied Germany. No one is injured in the incident.
- April 15 – The Pan American World Airways Lockheed L-1049C-55-81 Super Constellation Clipper Empress of the Skies, operating as Flight 1–10, crashes short of the runway at Shannon Airport in Shannon, Ireland, killing 30 of the 31 people on board and leaving the lone survivor injured.
- April 17 – The U.S. Joint Chiefs of Staff inform the U.S. Atomic Energy Commission that the United States must establish a stockpile of atomic weapons if the United States Armed Forces are to sustain an immediate air offensive against the Soviet Union in the event of war.
- April 18 – The flag carrier of Cyprus, Cyprus Airways, begins flight operations, using three Douglas DC-3 airliners flown by British pilots from British European Airways (BEA) to offer service from Nicosia to Athens, Beirut, Cairo, Haifa, Istanbul, London, and Rome.
- April 21
  - The Vickers 610 Viking 1B G-AIVE, operating as British European Airways Flight S200P, crashes into Irish Law Mountain in North Ayrshire, Scotland. Although the left engine and wing break off and the rest of the aircraft breaks into three pieces and bursts into flames, there are no fatalities; 13 of the 20 people aboard suffer injuries.
  - Pennsylvania Central Airlines is renamed Capital Airlines.
- April 26
  - During a dive, a North American YP-86 flown by George Welch becomes the first American fighter aircraft to exceed Mach 1.
  - During a long-range test flight that covers 3,528 miles (5,678 km) in 9½ hours over a round-robin course over California and Arizona at a true airspeed of 388 mph (624 km/h), the U.S. Air Force's first Northrop YB-49 jet-powered flying wing bomber prototype sets an endurance record for sustained flight above 40,000 feet (12,000 meters), remaining above that altitude for 6½ hours.
- April 28 – The U.S. Navy launches two P2V-3C Neptune aircraft – a version of the P2V configured for carrier launch carrying a nuclear weapon – from the aircraft carrier USS Coral Sea (CVB-43) off the coast of Virginia. The first carrier launches of any type of P2V, they establish the U.S. Navy's first, interim carrier-based nuclear strike capability pending the acquisition of aircraft designed from the outset to be capable of carrying a nuclear weapon from a carrier.
- April 28–29 – Leonardo Bonzi and Maner Lualdi set a light plane distance record of 4,170 km (2,590 mi) flying from Campoformido (Italy) to Massawa (Eritrea) in an Ambrosini S.1001.

=== May ===
- May 4 – Two hijackers commandeer a CSA Czech Airlines airliner during a domestic flight in Czechoslovakia from Brno to České Budějovice and force the pilot to fly them to Erding Air Base in the American occupation zone in Allied-occupied Germany.
- May 13 – Peter Wentworth-Fitzwilliam, 8th Earl Fitzwilliam, and Kathleen Cavendish, Marchioness of Hartington, the sister of future U.S. President John F Kennedy, are among the dead when a de Havilland Dove 1 (registration G-AJOU) crashes in violent weather in Saint-Bauzile, Ardèche, France, killing all four people on board.
- May 15 – The Royal Egyptian Air Force attacks Tel Aviv. The Israeli Air Force retaliates by striking Arab troops near Samakh.
- May 22 – Royal Egyptian Air Force (REAF) Supermarine Spitfire Mark IXs conduct three attacks against the Royal Air Force's (RAF's) Ramat David Airbase near Haifa in the newly declared State of Israel. Their first attack destroys two British Spitfires on the ground and damages eight others, and in their second attack they shoot down a Douglas Dakota while it is landing, killing four men on board. Their third attack is ineffective and loses one Spitfire to ground fire and four others to Spitfires of the RAF's No. 208 Squadron flying combat air patrol over the base. The REAF later claims that its pilots mistook the airbase for the Israeli Air Force base at Megiddo Airport, although the Israelis did not yet operate Spitfires.
- May 28
  - The Israeli Air Force is established.
  - The Royal Netherlands Navy commissions its first fleet aircraft carrier, HNLMS Karel Doorman (R81), which formerly had served in the British Royal Navy as HMS Venerable. She replaces the first Dutch carrier, the escort carrier HNLMS Karel Doorman (QH1).
- May 29 – Former United States Marine Corps pilot Lou Lenart, flying one of the four Avia S-199s that make up the Israeli Air Force's only fighter squadron, leads an air attack against an Egyptian Army ground column threatening Tel Aviv, forcing it to turn back short of the city. He is hailed as "The Man Who Saved Tel Aviv".

=== June ===
- The United States Air Force changes its designation for its fighter aircraft from P (for "pursuit") to F (for "fighter") and its designation for its ground-attack aircraft from A (for "attack") to B (for "bomber").
- June 1
  - British European Airways (BEA) commences the first helicopter air mail service in the United Kingdom.
  - The U.S. Navy's Naval Air Transport Service and the U.S. Air Force Air Transport Command's Air Transport Service merge to form the Military Air Transport Service (MATS) under the direction of the U.S. Air Force. The merger places some U.S. Navy and all U.S. Air Force strategic airlift resources under MATS.
- June 4
  - Philippine Airlines begins the first transpacific sleeper service, using Douglas DC-6 airliners between San Francisco, California, and Manila in the Philippine Islands.
  - A passenger and a crew member aboard a Jugoslovenske Sovjet Transport Aviacija (JUSTA) Douglas C-47 Skytrain draw guns during a domestic flight in the Socialist Federal Republic of Yugoslavia from Beograd to Sarajevo and force the pilot to fly to Bari, Italy.
- June 5 – The U.S. Air Force's second Northrop YB-49 jet-powered flying wing bomber prototype crashes during a performance test flight on the test range in California's Antelope Valley, killing all five men on board. The airframe has 57 hours of flight time on it at the time of the crash.
- June 8 – Air India commences a regular Bombay-London service using Lockheed Constellations.
- June 17
  - A Transporturi Aeriene Româno-Sovietice (TARS) Douglas C-47 Skytrain is hijacked during a domestic flight over Romania and forced to fly to Salzburg Airport in Salzburg, Austria.
  - The Douglas DC-6 Mainliner Utah (NC37506), operating as United Air Lines Flight 624, crashes near Aristes, Pennsylvania, killing all 43 people on board. American theatrical producer, director, songwriter, and composer Earl Carroll and American singer, dancer, and actress Beryl Wallace are among the dead.
- June 26 – The Berlin Airlift begins, with U.S. Air Force, Royal Air Force, and British civil transport aircraft carrying supplies into West Berlin.
- June 28 – Royal Air Force Squadron Leader Basil Arkel sets a new helicopter speed record of 124 mph (200 km/h) in a Fairey Gyrodyne.
- June 30 – Anti-Communists hijack a TABSO Junkers Ju 52 over Bulgaria during a domestic flight from Varna to Sofia. The pilot is killed during a struggle with them, and they force the airliner to fly to Istanbul, Turkey.

=== July ===
- The U.S. Joint Chiefs of Staff request that the United States establish an inventory of 150 atomic bombs for use against 100 urban targets in the event of war with the Soviet Union.
- July 1 – With the transfer of its assets to the new Military Air Transportation Service completed, the U.S. Navy's Naval Air Transport Service is disestablished.
- July 4 – A Scandinavian Airlines Douglas DC-6 and an Avro York C.1 of No. 99 Squadron, Royal Air Force, collide over Northwood in London in the United Kingdom. Both aircraft crash, killing all seven people aboard the York and all 32 people on board the DC-6. Among the dead is High Commissioner for the Federation of Malaya Sir Edward Gent, who had been a passenger aboard the York.
- July 6 – The U.S. Navy forms its first two carrier-based airborne early warning squadrons, Airborne Early Warning Squadron 1 (VAW-1) and Airborne Early Warning Squadron 2 (VAW-2).
- July 13 – A Bristol Type 170 Freighter makes the first flight of Silver City Airways' air car-ferry service between Lympne, England, and Le Touquet, France.
- July 14 – De Havilland Vampire F3s of the Royal Air Force's No. 54 Squadron become the first jet aircraft to fly across the Atlantic Ocean. The six aircraft, commanded by Wing Commander D. S. Wilson-MacDonald, DSO, DFC, go via Stornoway, Iceland, and Labrador to Montreal on the first leg of a goodwill tour of Canada and the United States, where they give several formation aerobatic displays.
- July 16 – The PBY Catalina flying boat Miss Macao (VR-HDT), operated by a Cathay Pacific subsidiary, flying from Macau to Hong Kong with 23 passengers and three crew on board, is hijacked midway over China's Pearl River Delta by a group of four hijackers attempting to rob the passengers. The hijackers attack the pilot, who loses control of the aircraft during the ensuing struggle in the cockpit. The subsequent crash kills all on board except one passenger, later identified as the lead hijacker. It is the first known airliner hijacking outside the Eastern Bloc.
- July 21 – A U.S. Air Force Boeing F-13 Superfortress photographic reconnaissance aircraft on a low-level atmospheric research flight accidentally ditches in Nevada's Lake Mead and sinks. The entire crew of five escapes safely in life rafts.

=== August ===
- August 28 – The U.S. Navy Martin JRM-2 Mars flying boat Caroline Mars arrives in Chicago, Illinois, after a record-breaking nonstop flight of 4,748 miles (7,641 km) from Honolulu, Hawaii, in 24 hours 12 minutes with 42 people and a payload of 42,000 pounds (19,000 kg) on board.
- August 29 – Northwest Airlines Flight 421, a Martin 2-0-2, loses part of its left wing in a thunderstorm and crashes between Fountain City, Wisconsin, and Winona, Minnesota, killing all 37 people on board.

=== September ===
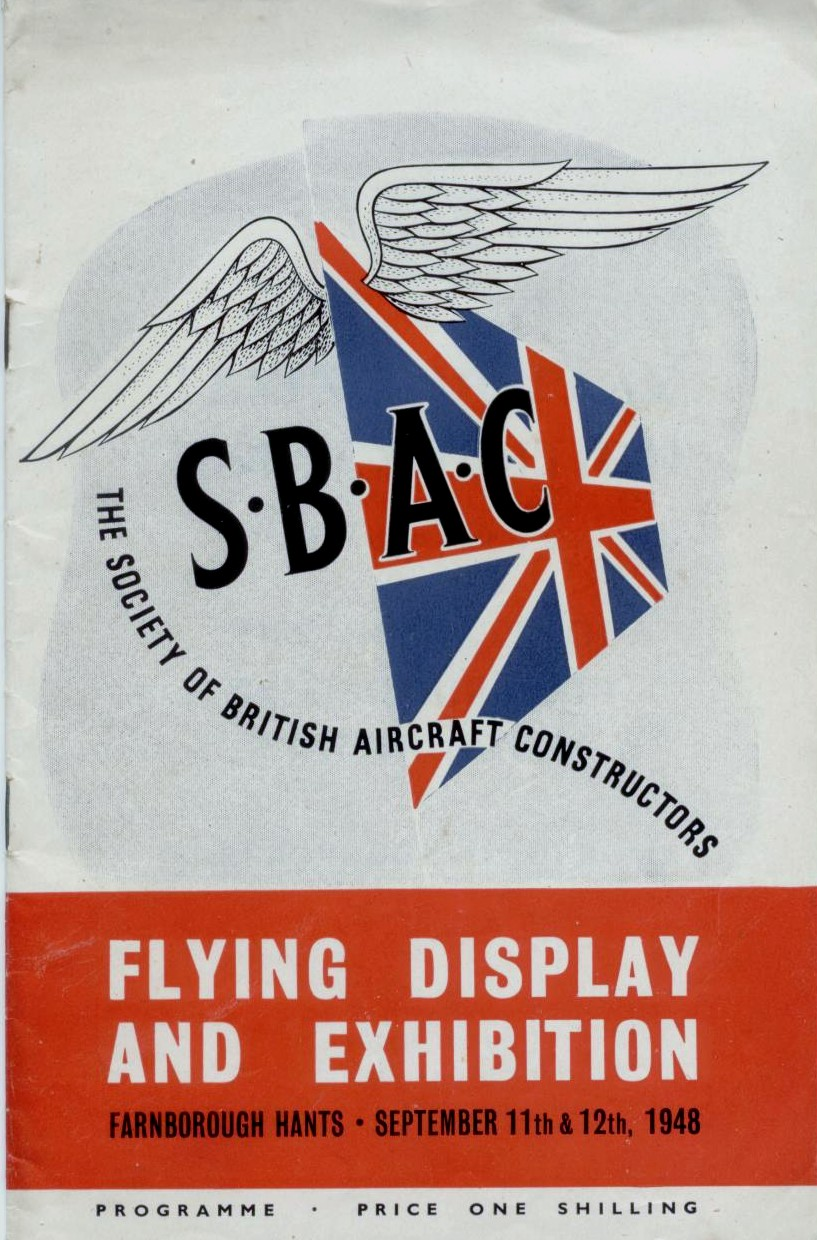
Cover of the 1948 Farnborough Airshow programme

- September 2 – The Australian National Airways Douglas DC-3 Lutana crashes into the North West Slopes of Australia's Great Dividing Range near Nundle, New South Wales, killing all 13 people on board.
- September 5 – On a 390-mile (628-km) flight from Naval Air Station Patuxent River, Maryland, to Cleveland, Ohio, the U.S. Navy Martin JRM-2 Mars flying boat Caroline Mars sets a new cargo record of 62,262 pounds (28,242 kg), the heaviest payload any aircraft had ever carried.
- September 6 – A de Havilland DH.108 breaks the sound barrier, the first British aircraft to do so.
- September 11 & 12 – The first Farnborough International Airshow is held
- September 12 – Eight hijackers commandeer a Technical and Aeronautical Holdings (TAE) Douglas C-47B-15-DK Skytrain (registration SX-BAH) with 21 people aboard during a domestic flight over Greece from Athens to Thessaloniki and force it to fly them to Tetovo in the Socialist Federal Republic of Yugoslavia. The hijackers deplane at Tetovo, and the airliner resumes its journey to Thessaloniki. The 1987 Greek movie Kloios will be based in this incident.
- September 15
  - The Government of Burma establishes Union of Burma Airways. It eventually will become Myanmar National Airlines.
  - Flying an F-86A Sabre fighter, U.S. Air Force Major Richard L. Johnson sets a world speed record of 670.981 mph (1,079.839 km/h).
- September 16 – President Harry S. Truman endorses National Council Report 30 (NSC-30), reserving to the President of the United States the power to order the use of atomic bombs by the United States Armed Forces.
- September 18
  - A Royal Air Force de Havilland Mosquito crashes during an air show at RAF Manston on the Isle of Thanet in northeastern Kent, England, killing both of its crewmen and 10 spectators on the ground.
  - The Convair XF-92A, the world's first delta-wing airplane, makes its first flight. The flight takes place at Muroc Dry Lake, California.
  - Eugene Joseff, who as Joseff of Hollywood and Joseff: Jeweler of the Stars supplied 90 percent of the jewelry used in Hollywood films and who also was founder and president of Joseff Precision Metal Products, a maker of aircraft and missile parts, dies when the plane he is piloting crashes in fog two miles (3.2 km) north of Newhall, California, five minutes after takeoff from Newhall Airport. The three men with him aboard the plane as passengers also die.
- September 25 – Flying in rain and fog, American professional wrestler Joe Lynam dies when his U.S. Navy surplus North American SNJ-4 Texan trainer crashes into Horse Ridge 500 feet (150 meters) below its summit just after takeoff from Bend, Oregon.
- September 28–29 (overnight) – An Israeli Douglas C-54 Skymaster military transport aircraft converted for civilian use to carry President of Israel Chaim Weizmann from Geneva, Switzerland, to Israel makes the flight with extra fuel tanks installed to allow a nonstop trip and painted with the logo of the "El Al/Israel National Aviation Company". The flight begins the history of Israel's national airline, El Al, which will be incorporated in November.

=== October ===
- October 1 – Transcontinental and Western Air inaugurates luxury all-sleeper service between New York City and Paris. The Paris-bound service is marketed as "Paris Sky Chief", the New York-bound service as "New York Sky Chief".
- October 2 – Bukken Bruse disaster: The pilots of the Det Norske Luftfartsselskap flying boat Bukken Bruse, a Short Sandringham with 43 people on board, lose control of the aircraft while attempting to land at Hommelvik in Malvik Municipality, Norway; the aircraft crashes and rapidly fills with water. Nineteen people die; the British philosopher Bertrand Russell is among the survivors and is hospitalized.
- October 6 – 1948 Waycross B-29 crash: A U.S. Air Force B-29-100-BW Superfortress bomber on a flight to test the secret Sunseeker infrared homing device later used on the AIM-9 Sidewinder air-to-air missile crashes in Waycross, Georgia, shortly after takeoff from Robins Air Force Base, killing nine of the 13 men on board. The four survivors parachute to safety.
- October 10 – For the second time, a modified de Havilland Mosquito launches an expendable, unmanned, rocket-powered 30-percent-scale model of the cancelled British Miles M.52 supersonic research aircraft at high altitude. The first launch, in October 1947, had failed, but this time the model reaches Mach 1.38 in stable, level flight. Work on the project is discontinued after the flight.
- October 20 – 1948 KLM Constellation air disaster: KLM Lockheed L-049-46-25 Constellation PH-TEN Nijmegen crashes at about 23:32 UTC into power cables on high ground on approach to Glasgow Prestwick Airport, in Prestwick, Scotland, killing all 40 people on board, most on impact. Deteriorating visibility and inadequate charts are cited as causes. Among the KLM staff killed are the pilot, Koene Dirk Parmentier (a winner of the MacRobertson Air Race); the cofounder, Edgar Fuld; and the technical director, Hendrik Veenendaal.
- October 21 – United States Naval Reserve Naval Cadet Jesse L. Brown receives his Naval Aviator Badge, becoming the first African-American naval aviator.

=== November ===
- November 15 – El Al is incorporated and becomes Israel's national airline.
- November 20 – An Israeli Air Force F-51 Mustang of 101 Squadron flown by a former United States Army Air Forces pilot shoots down a Royal Air Force Mosquito PR.34 photographic reconnaissance aircraft on a mission to photograph Israeli airfields, killing the Mosquito's two-man crew. The Israeli acquisition of Mustangs surprises the British and prompts them to suspend Mosquito reconnaissance flights over Palestine.
- November 30 – The U.S. Joint Intelligence Committee reports that as of August 1, 1948, the Soviet Air Force has 500,000 men and 15,000 aircraft and could deploy an additional 5,000 combat aircraft by six months after the beginning of a war. It forecasts that the Soviet Union will have a growing number of atomic bombs after 1950 with 20 to 50 available by 1956 or 1957, and that by 1957 the Soviet Air Force will be capable of attacking the continental United States and Canada.

=== December ===
- Mordechai Hod smuggles a Supermarine Spitfire into Israel by flying it all the way from Czechoslovakia.
- December 1 – The United States Air Force creates the Continental Air Command and subordinates the Air Defense Command and the Tactical Air Command to it.
- December 7–8 – A U.S. Air Force Convair B-36 Peacemaker bomber flies from Carswell Air Force Base outside Fort Worth, Texas, to Hawaii, drops a 10,000 lb (4,536 kg) dummy bomb into the Pacific Ocean, and returns to Carswell. It makes the nonstop 9,400-mile (15,100 km), 35-hour round trip without refueling.
- December 16 – The Royal Australian Navy commissions its first aircraft carrier, HMAS Sydney (R17).
- December 17 – The original Wright Flyer goes on display at the Smithsonian Institution.
- December 22 – Using Douglas DC-4s, Northwest Orient Airlines inaugurates service between the continental United States and Hawaii.
- December 24
  - Aeroput, Yugoslavia's first civilian airline and the flag carrier of the Kingdom of Yugoslavia from 1927 to April 1941, when the German invasion of Yugoslavia knocked it out of business and destroyed most of its property, is liquidated after the Communist government of the Socialist Federal Republic of Yugoslavia bans private joint-stock companies like Aeroput. Aeroput had never resumed operations, and JAT Jugoslovenski Aerotransport had replaced it as the national flag carrier in April 1947.
  - As a public relations move, the U.S. Air Force issues a communique claiming that an "early warning radar net to the north" had detected "one unidentified sleigh, powered by eight reindeer, at 14,000 feet [4,300 meters], heading 180 degrees." The "report" is passed along to the public by the Associated Press. It is the first time that the U.S. armed forces have issued a statement about tracking Santa Claus's sleigh on Christmas Eve; doing so will become an annual holiday tradition beginning in 1955.
- December 28 – The Douglas DC-3 NC16002 disappears on a flight from San Juan, Puerto Rico, to Miami, Florida, with the loss of all 32 people on board.

== First flights ==
- Hiller UH-12

=== January ===
- January 8 – Lavochkin La-174, prototype of the La-15
- January 21 - Jodel D.9 Bébé

=== February ===
- February 4 – Douglas Skyrocket
- February 22 – LWD Junak
- February 27 – SNCASO SO.7010 Pégase

=== March ===
- March 5 – Curtiss XP-87 Blackhawk, the last Curtiss-designed aircraft
- March 9 – Gloster E.1/44
- March 22 – Lockheed TF-80C, prototype of the Lockheed T-33 Shooting Star
- March 23 – Douglas XF3D-1, prototype of the Douglas F3D Skyknight

=== May ===
- May 7 – Tupolev Tu-78
- May 13 – Percival Prince
- May 30 – Martin XP5M-1, prototype of the Martin P5M Marlin

=== June ===
- June 1 – Cessna 170
- June 9 – SNCASE SE-1210
- June 12 – Avro Athena
- June 12 – Lazarov Laz-7
- June 15 – SNCASE SE-3101
- June 23 – Arsenal VG 70
- June 30 – Nord 1221 Norélan

=== July ===
- July 3 – Douglas XAJ-1
- July 8 – Ilyushin Il-28
- July 16 – Vickers Viscount
- July 20 – SNCAC NC.211 Cormoran
- July 22 – Castel-Mauboussin CM.7

=== August ===
- August 16 – Northrop XF-89, prototype of the F-89 Scorpion
- August 23 – XF-85 Goblin
- August 25 – Hurel-Dubois HD.10
- August 29 – Piaggio P.136

=== September ===
- September 1 – Saab J-29, Sweden's second jet
- September 3 - CSS-10
- September 18 – Convair XF-92, the world's first delta-winged airplane
- September 29 – Vought XF7U-1, prototype of the F7U Cutlass, the first American tailless production fighter
- September 30 – OKB-1 140 (or Junkers EF 140)

=== October ===
- October 5 – Westland WS-51 Dragonfly
- October 10 – Cierva W.14 Skeeter, prototype of the Saunders-Roe Skeeter
- October 12 – SNCAC NC.1071
- October 20 – McDonnell XF-88 Voodoo
- October 23 – Sud-Est SE.3000
- October 26 – Gloster Meteor T7

=== November ===
- November 12 – Sud-Ouest SE.6020 Espadon
- November 24 – SNCASE SE-1010

=== December ===
- December 2 – Beechcraft Model 45, prototype of the Beechcraft T-34 Mentor
- December 5 – Ilyushin Il-20
- December 7 – Cierva W.11 Air Horse G-ALCV
- December 16 – X-4 Bantam
- December 29 – Supermarine Type 510

== Entered service ==
- Hiller OH-23 Raven with the United States Army
- North American P-82 Twin Mustang, last United States Army Air Forces piston-engined fighter to enter service, with the 27th Fighter Group

=== March ===
- Martin AM Mauler with Attack Squadron 17A (VA-17A), United States Navy
- March 10 – North American FJ-1 Fury – the United States Navy′s first operational jet aircraft – with Fighter Squadron 1 (VF-1) aboard USS Boxer (CV-21)

=== April ===
- April 22 – North American B-45 Tornado with the United States Air Force

=== May ===
- May 5 – McDonnell FH Phantom with U.S. Navy Fighter Squadron 17 (VF-17) aboard USS Saipan (CVL-48)

=== June ===
- June 1 – Convair CV-240 Convairliner with American Airlines
- June 2 – Convair B-36 Peacemaker with the United States Air Force's 7th Bombardment Wing (Heavy)

=== October ===
- Handley Page Hastings with the Royal Air Force

=== November ===
- North American B-45 Tornado with the U.S. Air Force's 47th Bombardment Wing

== Retirements ==
- Curtiss Hawk 75A by the Finnish Air Force
- Dewoitine D.26 by the Swiss Air Force

=== September ===
- September 14 – Brewster F2A Buffalo by the Finnish Air Force

== Births ==
- August 8 – Svetlana Savitskaya, cosmonaut

== Deaths ==
- January 30 – Air Marshal Arthur Coningham, Royal Air Force lost in the disappearance of Star Tiger.
- March 7 – Air Vice Marshal Oliver Swann, Royal Naval Air Service and Royal Air Force.
- June 1 – Air Marshal John Frederick Andrews Higgins, Royal Air Force.
