= Swiss International Air Lines Flight 850 =

2002 aviation accident

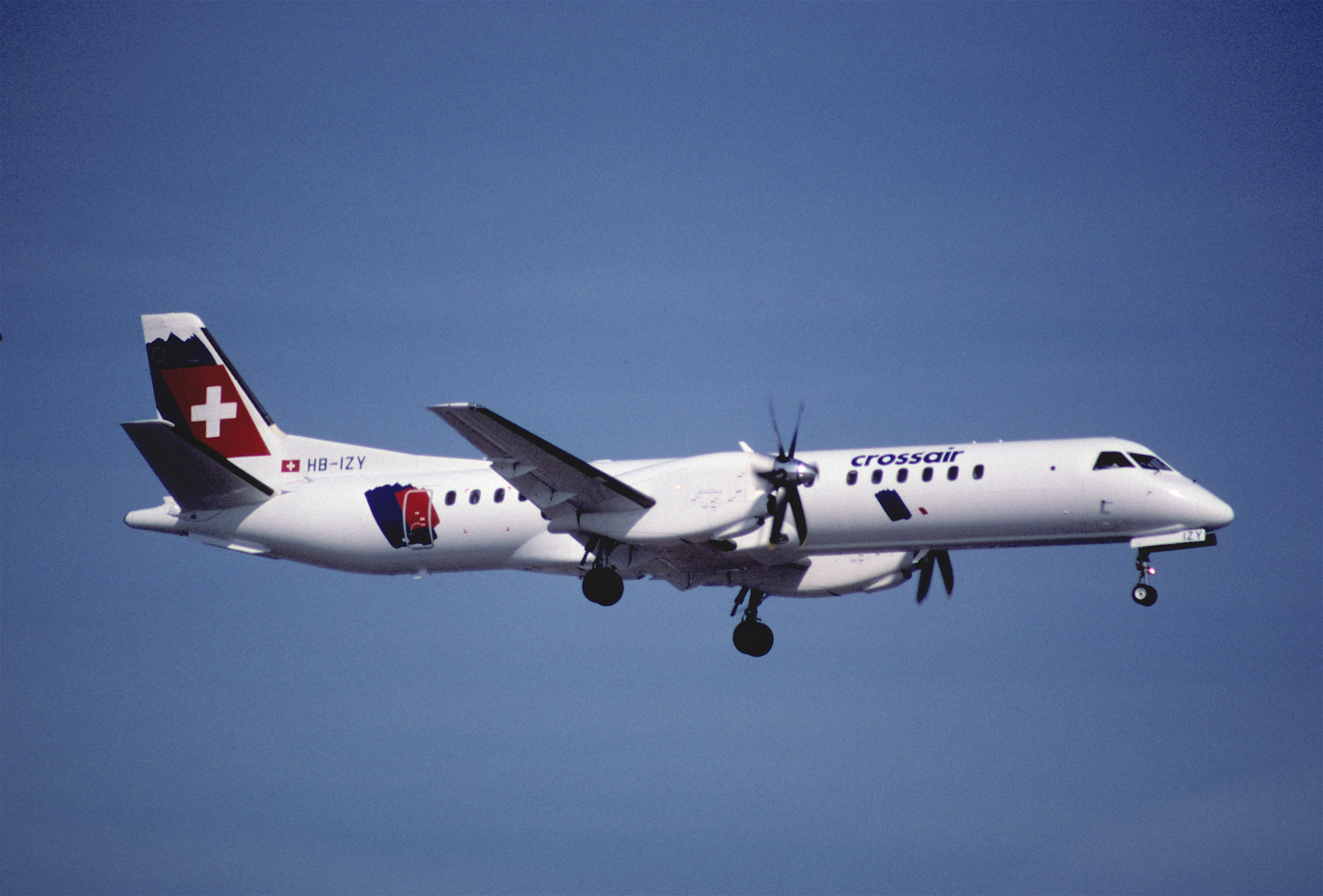
- HB-IZY, the Saab 2000 involved, while still in operation with Crossair

Accident
- Date: 10 July 2002
- Summary: Crashed on landing
- Site: Werneuchen Airfield, Germany; 52°37′58″N 13°46′12″E

Aircraft
- Aircraft type: Saab 2000
- Aircraft name: Doldenhorn
- Operator: Swiss International Air Lines
- Registration: HB-IZY
- Flight origin: Basel Airport, Switzerland
- Destination: Fuhlsbüttel Airport, Hamburg, Germany
- Occupants: 20
- Passengers: 16
- Crew: 4
- Fatalities: 0
- Injuries: 1
- Survivors: 20

Swiss International Air Lines Flight 850 was an international scheduled passenger flight from Basel, Switzerland, to Hamburg, Germany. On 10 July 2002, the flight was unable to land at Fuhlsbüttel Airport due to weather. Attempts were made to divert to other airports at Berlin and Eberswalde before the crew decided to land at Werneuchen. On landing, the aircraft struck an earth bank which ripped off all three undercarriage legs, and came to rest on its belly with an engine on fire. One of the sixteen passengers suffered minor injuries. The aircraft was written off.

The investigation into the accident by the German Federal Bureau of Aircraft Accident Investigation (BFU) took over eight years to complete. It raised a number of issues, including poor crew resource management, insufficient weather information being passed to the crew of Flight 850 and faulty runway markings at Werneuchen Airfield, where the runway had been reduced in length from 2,400 metres (7,900 ft) to 1,500 metres (4,900 ft), but the runway markings had not been altered to reflect this.

== Aircraft ==
The aircraft involved was a Saab 2000, registered HB-IZY, first flown in 1997. At the time of the accident, it had completed 12,303 hours of flight and made 12,069 landings.

== Accident ==
All times are UTC (Zulu Time), local time was two hours ahead of UTC.

Flight 850 was originally scheduled to be operated by an Embraer 145 aircraft. Due to the non-availability of the Embraer 145, a Saab 2000 was substituted, and the briefing for the flight was extended by 15 minutes. Actual departure was at 14:55 UTC, 10 minutes behind schedule. It carried four crew and 16 passengers. Weather reports indicated a line of thunderstorms, winds up to 45 knots (83 km/h; 52 mph) could be expected at Fuhlsbüttel and the designated alternatives of Hannover and Bremen. A number of SIGMETs were issued about an hour before the flight departed Basel, but the flight crew did not receive these. The SIGMETs indicated a front was developing with thunderstorms reaching FL380 (38,000 feet (12,000 m)) in the Bremen area. The Terminal Aerodrome Forecast for Fuhlsbüttel Airport, Hamburg valid from 13:00 to 22:00 was: TAF EDDH 101200Z 101322 31010KT 9999 FEW025 TEMPO 1320 29020G40KT 3000 TSRA BKN013CB Tempo 1922 4000 RA BKN014.

Runway 23 was the active runway at Fuhlsbüttel. On approach to land, the flight encountered severe turbulence due to a thunderstorm and the crew aborted the approach as the aircraft descended through 3,300 feet (1,000 m). It was later established that a derecho had formed. Winds of 81 knots (150 km/h) were recorded, and seven people were killed in the Berlin area. The storm was described as the worst summer storm in 50 years in Berlin. The crew decided to hold while they assessed their alternatives. The designated alternative airport was Bremen Airport, some 55 nautical miles (102 km; 63 mi) to the south-west. To reach Bremen would have meant flying through the frontal system. Another aircraft successfully landed on Runway 33 at Hamburg, reporting strong winds. The crew of Flight 850 declined to attempt a landing on Runway 23, and requested a diversion to Langenhagen Airport, Hannover. Air Traffic Control (ATC) did not suggest any other alternatives, nor were they requested by the crew.

En route, the frontal system prevented the crew from turning towards Hannover. A decision was made to divert to Tegel Airport, Berlin. The Automatic Terminal Information Service at Tegel stated that the weather there was clear and no significant change was expected. Approaching Tegel's Runway 08L, the crew requested priority handling, stating that they had fuel for 40 minutes flight. On approach, severe turbulence was again encountered due to the frontal system having reached Berlin. The approach was abandoned and the crew requested an alternate airfield from ATC. Eberswalde Airfield was suggested and accepted by the crew, who stated "We'll take anything at this point". On hearing this remark, ATC treated the aircraft's situation as an emergency. En route to Eberswalde, thunderstorms were observed and alternates were sought from ATC.

Hamburg ATC then offered Neubrandenburg Airport, which was rejected by the crew of Flight 850 on receiving the weather information. Werneuchen Airfield was then offered, which was 20 nautical miles (37 km) away and offered a runway 1,500 metres (4,900 ft) long. Werneuchen was accepted by the crew. ATC managed to contact the chairman of the flying club based at Werneuchen. He stated that the runway surface was 2,400 metres (7,900 ft) long, but an earth bank stretched across the runway leaving 1,500 metres (4,900 ft) available. Landing on Runway 08 meant that the first part of the runway fell before the earth bank. Almost an hour after aborting the approach to Fuhlsbüttel, Flight 850 began its approach to Werneuchen. The crew reported that they were visual with the runway and were advised by Werneuchen ATC that they needed to land on the eastern part of Runway 08. When Flight 850 turned onto its final approach, the captain remarked that the runway was "longer than Berne", and told the first officer to land wherever he wanted. Although the closed off part of the runway had been marked as such, the markings had weathered severely over the years, meaning that the original markings were easier to see than those that actually applied. Fading light and a lack of runway lighting contributed to the inability of the crew to see the earth bank.

The first officer landed the aircraft at what appeared to be the runway threshold. It then came in contact with the earth bank which ripped off all three undercarriage legs and the aircraft slid to a halt on its belly. The fire alarm for the port engine sounded, and the crew performed fire drills on both engines. One female passenger injured her leg.

== Investigation ==
The German Federal Bureau of Aircraft Accidents Investigation (BFU) opened an investigation into the accident, which was to take 3,005 days (over eight years) to complete. It found that a combination of factors caused the accident. Had the crew received the SIGMETs, the BFU considers it is likely that the crew would have realised that the thunderstorms were not isolated, but part of a system, and therefore made different decisions to those that they did.

The METARs for both Tegel and Schönefeld airports showed CAVOK and NOSIG, the latter element was criticised by the BFU. At 17:50, this METAR was issued at Tegel Airport: EDDT 04001KT CAVOK 30/17 Q1002 A2959 0998 2947 NOSIG. At the time, the cold front was 30 kilometres (16 nmi) south west of Tegel, and had moved 100 kilometres (54 nmi) in the previous hour. The BFU was of the opinion that NOSIG should not have been in the METAR, and that a SPECI would have been required. At 18:20, a new METAR was issued at Tegel: EDDT VRB01KT 9999 FEW040CB SCT120 BKN260 29/17 Q1002 A2959 0998 2947 TEMPO 27025G55KT 2000 +TSRA BKN009 BKN015CB COMMENTS: OCNL LTNG AND CB SW OF STN. This METAR was issued two minutes before Flight 850 began its approach to Tegel.

The decision to abort the approach to Fuhlsbüttel was supported by the BFU, but not the decision to divert to Hannover. The decision to divert to Tegel was supported by the BFU, based on the incorrect information given to the crew of CAVOK and NOSIG at Tegel. On approach to Werneuchen, ATC did not use correct terminology. It also found that the runway markings at Werneuchen did not conform to the required standard.

== See also ==
- 1947 BOAC Douglas C-47 crash, another case of multiple diversions.
