= SNECMA 14R =

Radial piston aircraft engine

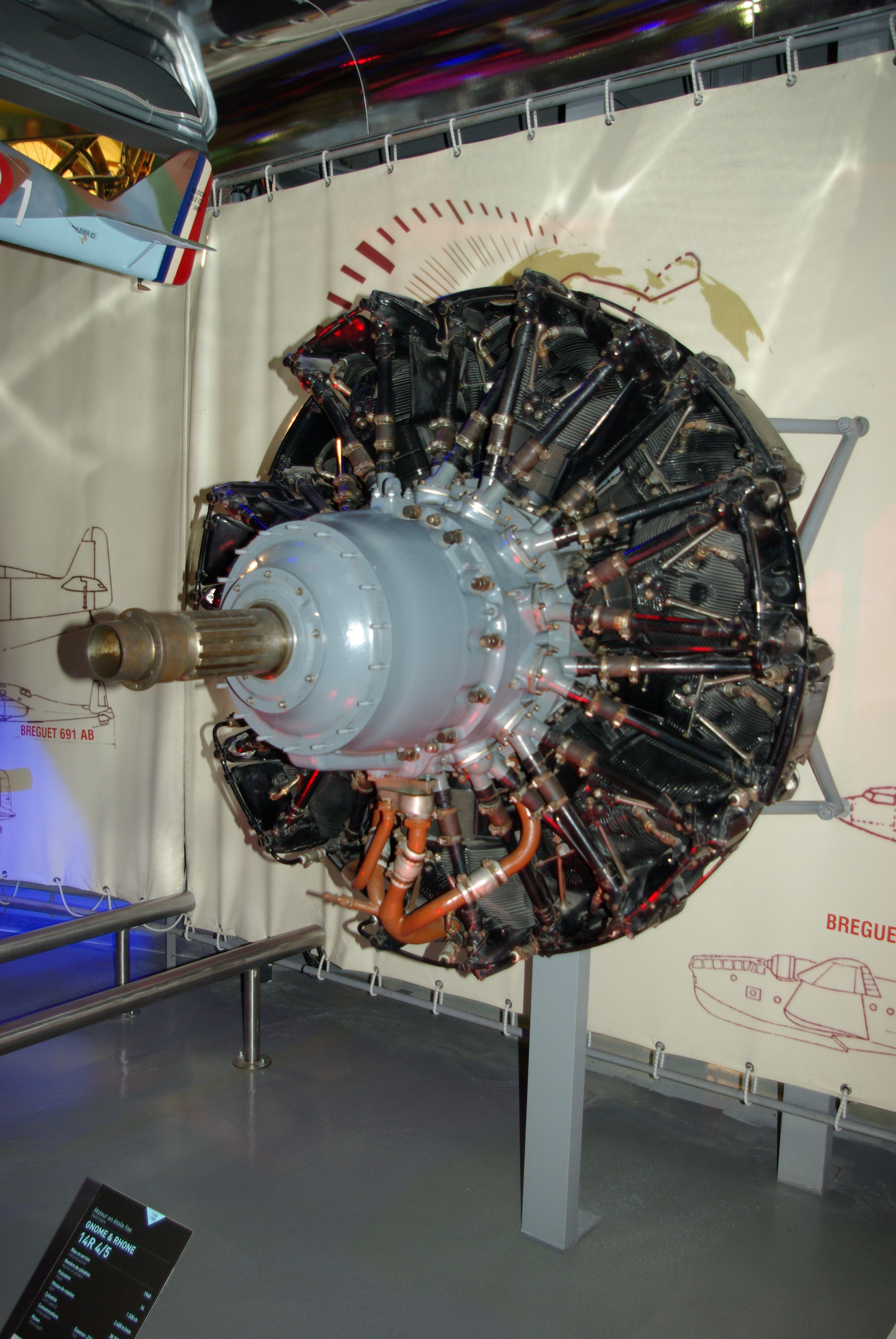
- Type: 14 cylinder two-row air-cooled radial piston engine
- National origin: France
- Manufacturer: Gnome-Rhône / SNECMA
- Major applications: Breguet Br 500 Colmar
- Developed from: Gnome-Rhône 14N

The SNECMA 14R was a 14-cylinder two-row air-cooled radial engine developed in France just prior to the start of World War II from the Gnome-Rhône 14N. The 14N radial engine was itself an improved version of the popular pre-war Gnome-Rhône 14K Mistral Major series; designed and manufactured by Gnome et Rhône, a major French aircraft engine manufacturer whose origins pre-date the First World War.

The improved 14R was initially known as the Gnome-Rhône 14P and then the Gnome-Rhône 14R. There were several improvements such as the introduction of a longer crankshaft and crankcase with a centre bearing, an increase in cylinder capacity, and a two-speed compressor. These changes allowed the engine to deliver 1,400hp at take-off and 1,300hp at 1,500m (1st gear) and 1200hp at 4000m (2nd gear). This came at the cost of a much increased total weight. It was expected that further development, such as the introduction of higher grade fuels, would lead to a power output of 1,660hp at low altitude.

With the Fall of France, engine development was stopped under the occupation. After the war, development recommenced; however production of this engine after 1945 was transferred to the newly formed SNECMA and the engine was renamed the SNECMA 14R.

== Variants ==
14R-04
Improved higher performance using 92 Octane fuel. 14N with 2-speed supercharge (6.5:1 and 9:1), LH rotation, 1,190 kW (1,590 hp) for take-off.
14R-05
RH rotation version of 14R-4.
14R-08
RPM increased from 2,400 to 2,600 improving power output. LH rotation.
14R-09
RH rotation version of 14R-08
14R-24
LH rotation, 1,200 kW (1,600 hp).
14R-25
RH rotation version of 14R-24.
14R-26
LH rotation, 1,200 kW (1,600 hp).
14R-27
RH rotation version of 14R-26.
14R-28
LH rotation, 1,200 kW (1,600 hp).
14R-29
RH rotation version of 14R-28.
14R-32
LH rotation
14R-100
14R-200
LH rotation
14R-201
RH rotation
14R-210
28T-1
28 cylinder, double 14R-24 engines placed back-to-back with co-axial contra-rotating propeller shafts, direct fuel injection, 2-speed supercharger, 77.4 L (4,720 cu in) displacement, delivering 2,400 kW (3,200 hp) for take-off using 100/130 octane fuel.

== Applications ==
- Sud-Est SE.200 Amphitrite
- SNCASE SE-1010
- Nord Noroit - only the prototypes had the Gnome-Rhône 14R
- Nord 1500 Noréclair
- Nord Noratlas - only the prototype had the Gnome-Rhône 14R
- SNCAC NC.211 Cormoran

== Specifications (14R-04) ==
Data from

=== General characteristics ===
- Type: 14 cylinder two-row air-cooled radial piston engine
- Bore: 146 mm (5.75 in)
- Stroke: 165 mm (6.50 in)
- Displacement: 38.7 L (2,361.62 cu in)
- Length: 1,635 mm (64.37 in)
- Diameter: 1,297 mm (51.06 in)
- Dry weight: 819 kg (1,806 lb)
- Frontal Area: 1.33 m^{2} (14.3 sq ft)

=== Components ===
- Valvetrain: Single inlet and exhaust valves operated by rockers and pushrods
- Supercharger: Gear-driven 2-speed supercharger at 6.5:1 and 9.0:1 ratios
- Fuel system: 1x Bronzavia updraught carburettor with automatic boost and altitude control
- Fuel type: 92 Octane gasoline
- Oil system: Pressure fed at 480 kPa (70 psi)
- Cooling system: Air-cooled with baffles
- Reduction gear: Planetary / epicyclic bevel reduction gearing at 0.67:1 ratio
- Starter: Air equipment electric inertia starter
- Ignition: 2 x R.B. magnetos, 2 x 18 mm (0.71 in) short reach spark plugs per cylinder fed by a shielded ignition harness.

=== Performance ===
- Power output:
- Take-off:1,590 hp (1,190 kW) at 2,600 rpm at 1,180 mm (46.46 in) Hg boost with 100 octane fuel
  - Military, low:1,660 hp (1,240 kW) at 2,600 rpm at 1,000 m (3,300 ft)
  - Military, high:1,580 hp (1,180 kW) at 2,600 rpm at 5,500 m (18,000 ft)
  - Normal, low:1,320 hp (980 kW) at 2,400 rpm at 2,100 m (6,900 ft)
  - Normal, high:1,230 hp (920 kW) at 2,400 rpm at 6,000 m (20,000 ft)
- Specific power: 31.85 kW/L (0.7 hp/cu.in)
- Compression ratio: 6.8:1
- Specific fuel consumption: 0.292 kg/kW/hr (0.48 lb/hp/hr)
- Oil consumption: 0.0067 kg/kW/hr (0.011 lb/hp/hr)
- Power-to-weight ratio: 1.494 kW/kg (0.909• hp/lb)
- B.M.E.P.: 1,470 kPa (213 psi)
- 14R-05 propeller rotates in opposite direction

== See also ==
Related lists

- List of aircraft engines
