= Stowting =

Village in Kent, England

Coordinates: 51.133°N 1.033°E

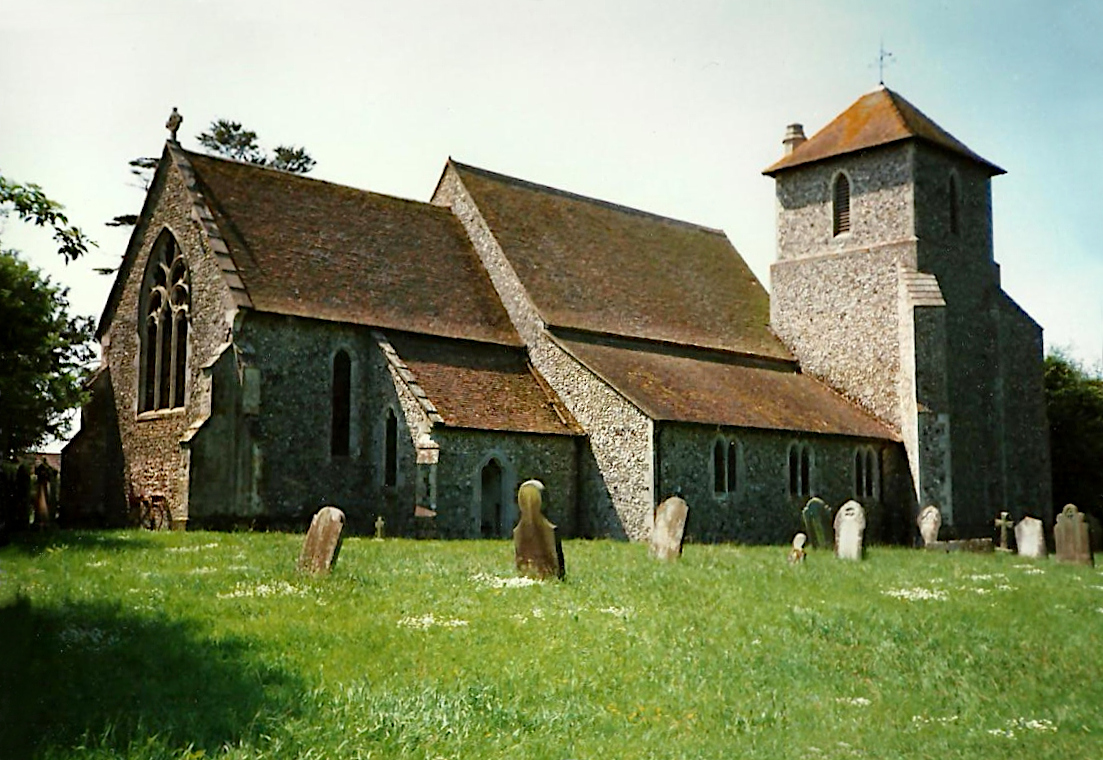
- St Mary's Church, Stowting

- Location within Kent
- Population: 238 (parish, 2001 Census)
- OS grid reference: TR124417
- District: Folkestone and Hythe
- Shire county: Kent
- Region: South East
- Country: England
- Sovereign state: United Kingdom
- Post town: Ashford
- Postcode district: TN25
- Police: Kent
- Fire: Kent
- Ambulance: South East Coast

Stowting is a village and civil parish in the English county of Kent. It is 6 miles (9.7 km) east of Ashford, 7 miles (11 km) north-west of Folkestone and 10 miles (16 km) south of Canterbury.

== History ==
The place name Stowting is Anglo-Saxon, meaning a 'place characterized by a mound.' It was known in the time of the Domesday Book as Stotinges and Estotinges, and in later records it was called Stutinges and Stowling.

The Manor of Stowting was given by Egelric Bigge, to Christ Church, in Canterbury in the year 1044. The parish church is 13th century with many later additions and alterations. It is dedicated to St Mary and is built from flint with stone dressings with a flint tower. It is a Grade II listed building. To the west of the church are the remains of a castle mound which are considered to be a particularly fine example of a Norman Motte-and-bailey castle. In 1947, a Douglas C-47A crashed on the hillside above the village, killing eight of the 16 people on board.

== The modern village ==
The scattered village stands at the southern foot of a chalk hill, part of the North Downs and is located beside a chalk spring. To the north of the village centre the hamlets of Stowting Common and Lymbridge Green are both part of the parish. The Roman Road of Stone Street runs 1 mile (1.6 km) to the east of the village whilst the Pilgrim's Way and North Downs Way footpath runs through the village itself.

Stowting has a Church of England primary school adjacent to the church. It has one pub, currently named The Tiger Inn, which dates to the 1600s and that displays a Mackesons Hythe Ales front fascia sign, depicting its earlier brewery ownership. Stowting Cricket Club was established in 1895 and plays at Dawes Field near the school and church.

The hamlet of Stowting Common is home to Jacksons Fencing Headquarters, a leading fencing manufacturer that employs over 280 people.

== Photo gallery ==
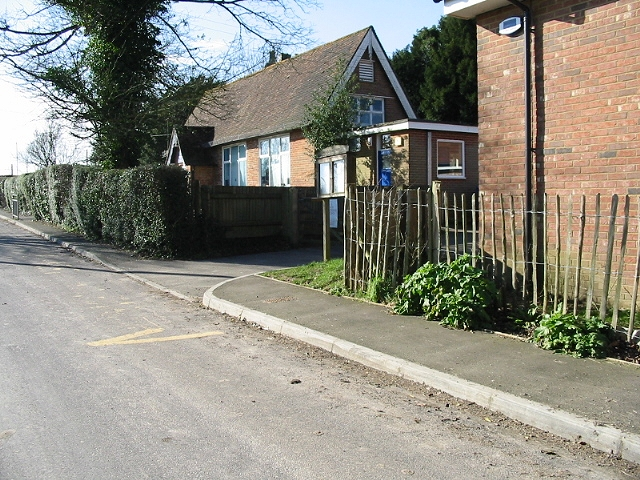
Stowting, old school building.

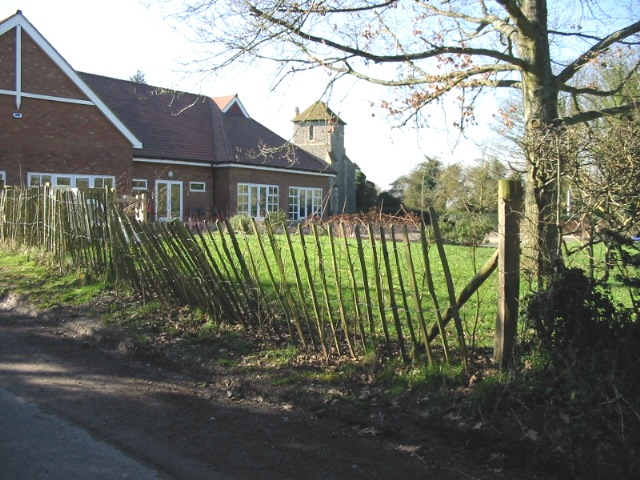
Stowting, new school building with church tower beyond.

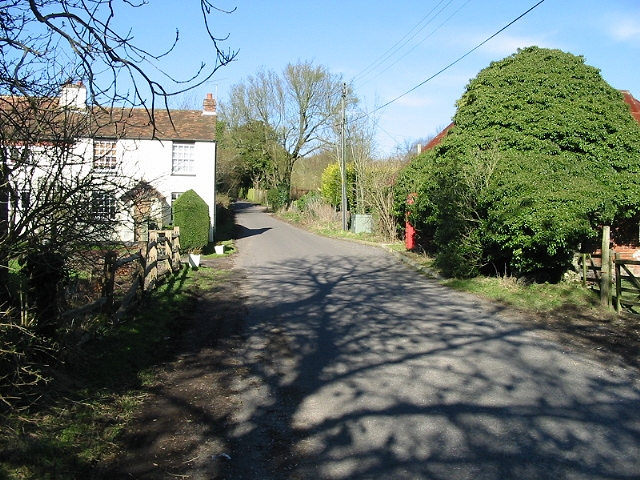
Stowting hill, looking north west.

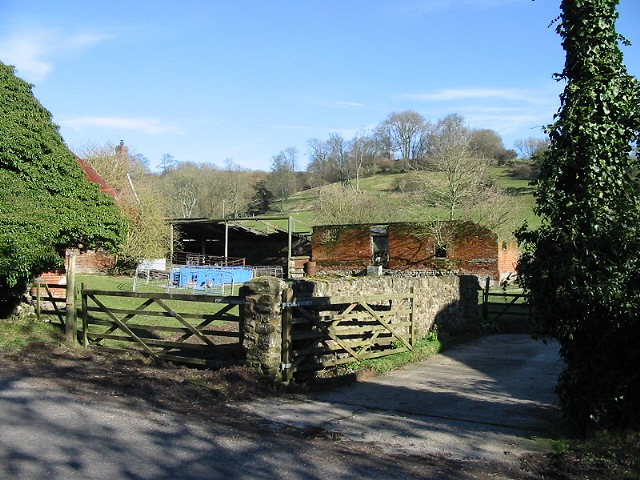
Stowting Hill, looking north east.

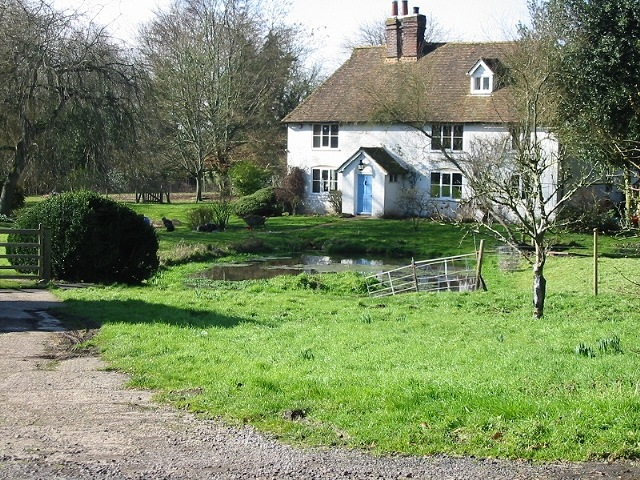
Stowting, cottage.

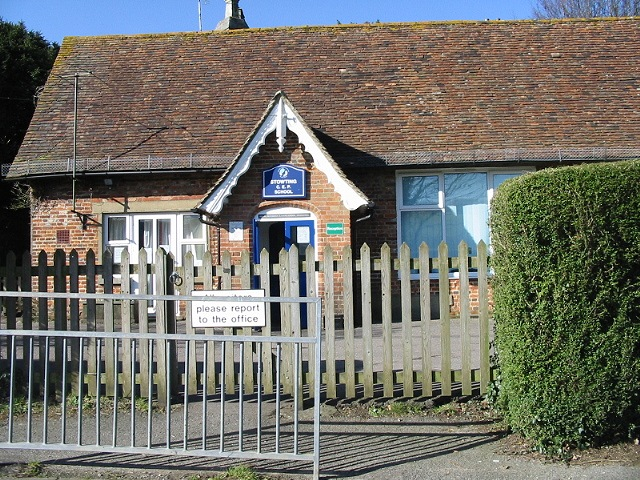
Old school building entrance.
