= Hodek HK-101 =

Czech light aircraft

HK-101

General information
- Type: Light aircraft
- National origin: Czechoslovakia
- Number built: 2

History
- First flight: September 1947

The Hodek Hk-101 was a Czechoslovak twin-engined, two seat light aircraft. Two prototypes were built in 1947, but development was abandoned after the 1948 Czechoslovak coup d'état.

== Development and design ==
In 1942, Vincenc Hodek, the owner of V. Hodek Praha, an aircraft instruments manufacturer based in Prague, (Note: The factory had been set up by Hodek in 1935, and since the German occupation and formation of the Protectorate of Bohemia and Moravia in March 1939, had been forced to carry out work in support of the German war industries.) and Stanislav Kříž began work on the design of a small twin-engined light sporting aircraft. To avoid drawing the attention of the Nazi German supervisors of the factory, design work was carried out in secret at night in Hodek's apartment. After the end of German occupation, Hodkek applied for permission to start construction of prototypes of the new aircraft, the HK-101. (Note: The HK in the aircraft's designation came from the surnames of the designers, Hodek and Kříž.) Construction of the first prototype began in a rented workshop in Libeň, Prague, with Hodek recruiting experienced technicians from the recently disbanded German Junkers and Škoda-Kauba companies to work on the HK-101.

The HK-101 was a low-wing cantilever monoplane of all-metal construction, with a retractable tailwheel undercarriage. It was powered by two 105 hp (78 kW) Walter Minor 4-III four-cylinder air-cooled inline engines in nacelles under the wings. The crew of two sat in tandem under a single side-hinging canopy, and were provided with dual controls, with the controls in the forward cockpit able to be easily disconnected. As well as the initial two-seater design, a single-seat version, and a version with larger wings was also planned.

While most Czechoslovak aviation companies were nationalised in 1945, Hodek's company remained in private hands at first, allowing construction of the prototype to continue, although it was slowed by strikes and by a shortage of funds. The first prototype was completed in the summer of 1947, with a wall of the workshop having to be demolished to allow the aircraft to be removed. The prototype made its first flight on 3 or 4 September, and was displayed (and flown) at an international airshow at Prague airport on 7 September. The HK-101 demonstrated good performance, and was considered suitable for use as a training aircraft, but had a very cramped cockpit, with poor visibility from the rear seat and not enough room to allow easy control from the front seat.

In January 1948, V. Hodek Praha was nationalised, with the new managers of the company uninterested in the HK-101, resulting in the partly built second prototype being handed over to Aero Vodochody for completion. In February 1948, the Czechoslovak Communist party seized control of the country, and although the second prototype flew in 1949, development was soon abandoned.

A fragment of the fin of the first prototype is preserved at the Prague Military History Institute.

== Specifications ==
Data from Jane's All the World's Aircraft 1948

General characteristics

- Crew: 2
- Length: 5.91 m (19 ft 5 in)
- Wingspan: 7.70 m (25 ft 3 in)
- Height: 1.95 m (6 ft 5 in)
- Wing area: 8.6 m^{2} (92.57 sq ft)
- Empty weight: 540 kg (1,190 lb)
- Gross weight: 820 kg (1,808 lb)
- Powerplant: 2 × Walter Minor 4-III four-cylinder air-cooled inverted inline engines, 78 kW (105 hp) each

Performance

- Maximum speed: 350 km/h (220 mph, 190 kn)
- Cruise speed: 300 km/h (190 mph, 160 kn)
- Range: 1,000 km (620 mi, 540 nmi)
- Service ceiling: 2,300 m (7,400 ft) (Absolute ceiling: 8,500 m (27,900 ft))
- Time to altitude: 3 min to 1,000 m (3,300 ft)
