= SNCASE SE-1010 =

Type of aircraft

SE-1010
- The sole prototype of the SE.1010

General information
- Type: Photo-survey aircraft
- National origin: France
- Manufacturer: SNCASE
- Status: Destroyed
- Number built: 1

History
- First flight: 24 November 1948
- Retired: 1 October 1949

The SNCASE SE-1010 was a late 1940s French photo-survey aircraft designed and built by SNCASE for the Institut Géographique National. One prototype was built, but it crashed and the project was cancelled.

== Design and development ==
In 1945 SNCASE designed a "stratospheric" transport for transatlantic postal work designated the SE-1000. The design was not built, but after the nose section was modified, it was built as high-altitude photo-survey aircraft for the Institut Géographique National, and re-designated the SE-1010. If it was decided not to use it as a survey aircraft, it was proposed to produce it as a 14-passenger transport instead.

The SE-1010 was a sleek, four-engined, mid-wing monoplane powered by four Gnome-Rhône 14R 14-cylinder two-row air-cooled radial engines. The prototype SE-1010, with French test registration F-WEEE, first flew on 24 November 1948. On 1 October 1949 the prototype entered a flat spin during test flying from Mariganne and crashed, killing the six person crew near Carcès. The project was canceled and the three aircraft being built were not completed.

== Variants ==
SE-1000
Proposed four-engined stratospheric transatlantic postal aircraft, not built.
SE-1010
High-altitude photo-survey aircraft, one built.
SE-1011
Production aircraft: three under construction when project was abandoned.
SE-1015
Long-range 18-seat courier airliner'
SE-1020
Maritime patrol aircraft with Jumo 213 engines and gun turrets.
SE-1030
Proposed 40-passenger airliner variant, not built.
SE-1035
Proposed airliner variant, not built.
SE-1040
Proposed turboprop test-bed to evaluate the Rolls-Royce Dart engine.

== Specification (Survey aircraft) ==
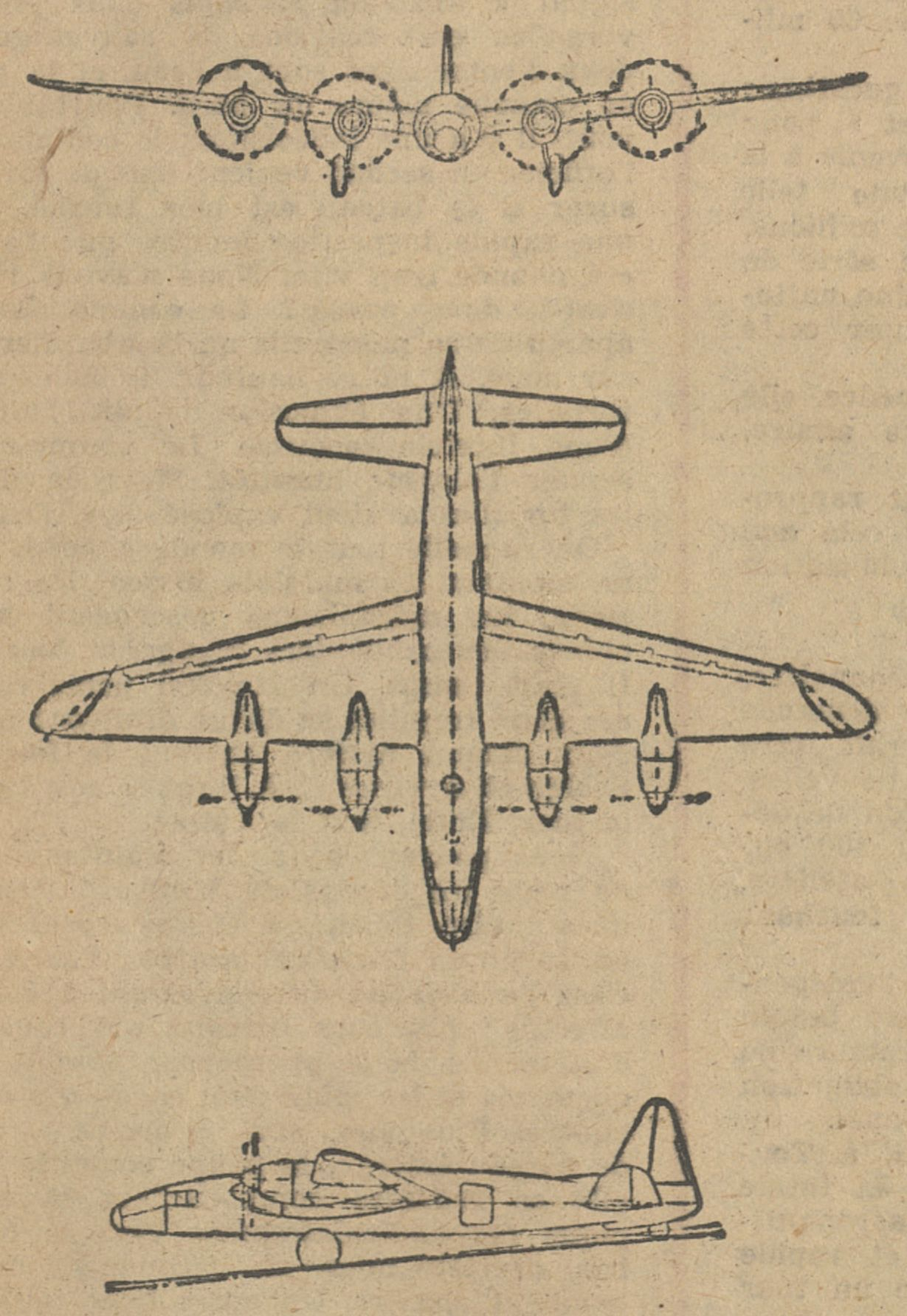
3-views of the SNCASE SE.1010

Data from French Postwar Transport Aircraft, Jane's all the World's Aircraft 1947

General characteristics

- Crew: 4
- Capacity: 14 pax, 4 pax with freight hold, 8 pax with freight hold, or 0 pax with 26.5 m^{3} (940 cu ft) freight hold
- Length: 21.81 m (71 ft 7 in)
- Wingspan: 31 m (101 ft 8 in)
- Height: 5.2 m (17 ft 1 in)
- Wing area: 116.3 m^{2} (1,252 sq ft)
- Empty weight: 14,000 kg (30,865 lb)
- Gross weight: 25,000 kg (55,116 lb) -27,000 kg (60,000 lb) (photographic aircraft)
- Gross weight passenger version: 33,000 kg (73,000 lb)
- Fuel capacity: 16,040 L (4,240 US gal; 3,530 imp gal) fuel;380 L (100 US gal; 84 imp gal) oil
- Powerplant: 2 × Gnome-Rhône 14R-28 14-cylinder two-row air-cooled radial engine, 1,200 kW (1,600 hp) each for take-off; LH rotation fitted to starboard
- Powerplant: 2 × Gnome-Rhône 14R-29 14-cylinder two-row air-cooled radial engine, 1,200 kW (1,600 hp) each for take-off; RH rotation fitted to port
- Propellers: 3-bladed Ratier, 3.8 m (12 ft 6 in) diameter constant-speed propellers

Performance

- Maximum speed: 635 km/h (395 mph, 343 kn) at 8,000 m (26,000 ft)
- Cruise speed: 540 km/h (340 mph, 290 kn) at 8,000 m (26,000 ft)
- Range: 7,300 km (4,500 mi, 3,900 nmi) no headwind
- Time to altitude: 8,000 m (26,000 ft) in 36 minutes; 9,000 m (30,000 ft) in 46 minutes
- Wing loading: 283 kg/m^{2} (58 lb/sq ft) at 33,000 kg (73,000 lb)
- Power/mass: 6.84 kg/kW (11.3 lb/hp) at 33,000 kg (73,000 lb)

== Bibliography ==
- Chillon, Jacques; Dubois, Jean-Pierre & Wegg, John (1980). French Post-War Transport Aircraft. Tonbridge, UK: Air-Britain. ISBN 0-85130-078-2.
- Mesnard, Joël (2018). "Tragique: The Sud-Est SE.1010". The Aviation Historian (25): 90–99. ISSN 2051-1930.
