= Megiddo Airfield =

Megiddo Airfield - Shachar 7 מנחת מגידו
- IATA: none; ICAO: LLMG

Summary
- Airport type: Public
- Operator: Jezreel Valley Regional Council
- Location: Afula, Northern District
- Elevation AMSL: 200 ft / 61 m
- Coordinates: 32°35′50.25″N 35°13′43.64″E
- Interactive map of Megiddo Airfield - Shachar 7

Runways
Direction	Length		Surface
Direction	ft	m	Surface
09/27	7,800	2,377	Asphalt

Megiddo Airfield (Hebrew: מנחת מגידו) (IATA: N/A, ICAO: LLMG), known as Shachar 7 by the Israel Defense Forces, is an Israeli airfield located in the Jezreel Valley near Tel Megiddo and 3 km (1.9 mi) southwest of Afula. It opened in 1942 as RAF Station Megiddo and was used as an auxiliary field to RAF Ramat David. It was used by 6 & 208 Squadrons.

It currently handles private and agricultural flights. It formerly served as an Israeli Air Force base and was decommissioned in the mid-1980s.

== Syrian defection ==
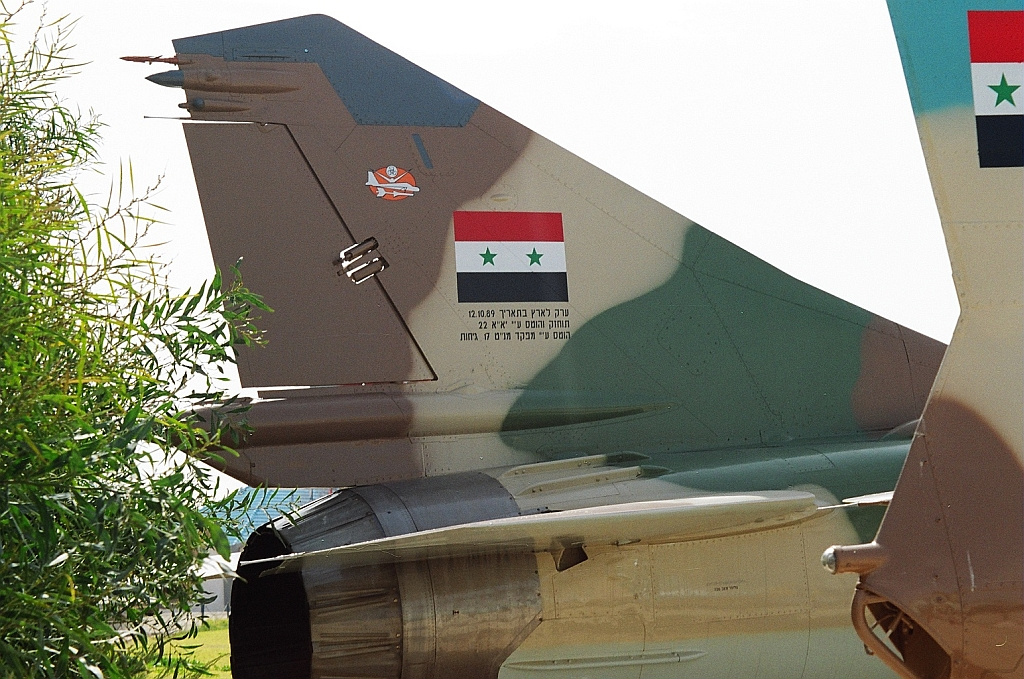
Defected Syrian MiG 23 at Hatzerim

On October 11, 1989, a Syrian Mikoyan-Gurevich MiG-23MLD defected to Israel, landing at Megiddo. The aircraft was subsequently flown by the IAF's Flight Test Center and is now on display at the IAF museum in Hatzerim.

== Plans for an international airport ==
In April 2006, Jezreel Valley Regional Council announced plans to construct an international airport in Megiddo in cooperation with several authorities. The new airport will be located on a 400 dunam (400,000 m^{2}, 100 acres) site, with construction costs estimated at $35 million. Officials report that the airport will undoubtedly increase tourism to the Jezreel Valley and surrounding areas.
