= Marinavia QR.14 Levriero =

Prototype Italian light aircraft

QR.14 Levriero

General information
- National origin: Italy
- Manufacturer: Construzioni Aeronautiche Taliedo / Marinavia Farina
- Number built: 1

History
- First flight: 8 October 1947

The Marinavia QR.14 Levriero (Note: Italian: Levriero, lit. 'Greyhound') was a prototype Italian twin-engined light aircraft. A single example was built during the early years of the Second World War, and was completed in 1943 but did not fly until 1947. No production followed.

== Design and development ==
In 1938, Luigi Queirolo, formerly technical director of an airline in Italian East Africa, set up, with fellow engineer Recanatini, a design studio for aircraft in Milan, submitting two single-engined light aircraft, the QR.2 bis and the QR.22, against a competition for a touring aircraft. In 1939, Queirolo submitted a new design, the QR.14, as an unarmed liaison and reconnaissance aircraft suitable for use in Italy's colonies. The design was reviewed by the Ministry of Aeronautics and rejected. Problems included the use of unsupercharged engines (110 hp (82 kW) Alfa Romeo 110s), which meant that the aircraft would be unsuitable for operations at the high altitudes of East Africa, and the belief that the performance estimates were optimistic.

Despite this, Queirolo continued with development of the QR.14, now aiming the aircraft at a requirement for a medium-range touring aircraft. Costruzioni Aeronautiche Taliedo, based at Milan-Taliedo airport, and a specialist in building gliders, was tasked with building the aircraft. Detailed design was carried out by two engineers (Silvio Del Proposto and Amilcare Amilcare Poro) from the adjacent Caproni aircraft factory, working after hours in Costruzioni Aeronautiche Taliedo's design office.

The QR.14 was a low wing monoplane of all wooden construction with a retractable tailwheel undercarriage. The aircraft had a circular-section monocoque fuselage, with a duralumin nosecone that could be removed to allow access to instruments and controls. The aircraft had an enclosed cabin, with four seats in two rows of two, and dual controls provided for the front pair of seats and a baggage compartment behind the rear pair. The wings had a rectangular section inner wings and elliptical outer wings, with the engine nacelles slung under the wings. The undercarriage mainwheels retracted rearwards into the nacelles. The tailplane and the fin and rudder were also elliptical. The aircraft was powered by two 130 hp (97 kW) Alfa Romeo 110 four-cylinder inline engines, driving two-bladed propellers. (Note: 145 hp (108 kW) de Havilland Gipsy Major engines were used according to Jane's All the World's Aircraft.)

Construction of the prototype was slow, delayed by the limited amount of time that Del Proposto and Poro could spend on the project and by financial issues. The prototype was completed in 1942, by which time Queirolo had left the company, but further delays were caused by unavailability of engines. This was solved by the receipt of Alfa Romeo 110 engines from a scrapped CANT Z.1012 in May 1943, but work on the QR.14 was suspended in June 1943 by order of the Ministry of Aeronautics as the aircraft was being built as a private venture without government order, with there also being concerns about the aircraft's stability.

The unflown prototype survived the rest of the Second World War, despite the German occupation of Italy. After the end of the war, the prototype was refurbished by Marinavia Farina, (Note: While Marinavia Farina was founded in 1946 by Domenico Farina, the Farina family had provided the finance to allow the prototype to be built.) with the hope of building a production series of 25 aircraft. The prototype finally made its first flight, under the command of test pilot Nello Valzania, at Vergiate airfield on 8 October 1947. On 12 October that year, it was entered in the "Premio Milano" air race, winning its category. Despite this racing success, the harsh economic conditions in post-war Italy meant that the production plans were not implemented, and the prototype was abandoned at Milan Linate Airport.

== Specifications (as built) ==
Data from Tre aerei da turismi poco noti

General characteristics

- Crew: 1
- Capacity: 3 passengers
- Length: 9.97 m (32 ft 9 in)
- Wingspan: 12.48 m (40 ft 11 in)
- Height: 3.06 m (10 ft 0 in)
- Wing area: 19.00 m^{2} (204.5 sq ft)
- Empty weight: 1,200 kg (2,646 lb)
- Max takeoff weight: 1,900 kg (4,189 lb)
- Powerplant: 2 × Alfa Romeo 110 four cylinder air-cooled inverted inline engine, 97 kW (130 hp) each

Performance

- Maximum speed: 310 km/h (190 mph, 170 kn) at 200 m (660 ft)
- Stall speed: 100 km/h (62 mph, 54 kn)
- Range: 1,350 km (840 mi, 730 nmi)
- Service ceiling: 6,000 m (20,000 ft)
- Time to altitude: 10 minutes to 3,000 m (9,800 ft)
