= SNCAC NC.211 Cormoran =

French transport aircraft with 4 piston engines, 1948

NC 211 Cormoran
- First and only production NC-211

General information
- Type: Civil/Passenger
- National origin: France
- Manufacturer: SNCAC (Société Nationale de Constructions Aéronautiques du Centre) / (Aérocentre)
- Number built: 2 + 9 partially completed

History
- First flight: 20 July 1948

The SNCAC NC.211 Cormoran was a large four-engined military transport aircraft for passengers and cargo designed and built by SNCAC from 1945.

== Design and development ==
In 1945, the French military wanted to create paratrooper divisions, but quickly found that they did not have any aircraft that could be used for this purpose. So, General Juin, the then chief of staff, ordered the Direction Technique Industrielle to evaluate interest for this project. SNCAC and Breguet Aviation answered positively and the SNCAC NC.210 was selected in December 1945 when a contract for 105 aircraft was awarded to SNCAC.

The NC.211 originated as the NC.210 powered by four 1,641 kW (2,200 hp) Gnome-Rhône 18R 18-cylinder radial engines. With a change of engine type to the 1,193 kW (1,600 hp) Gnome-Rhône 14R the designation changed to NC.211. Intended to provide the French Air Force, (French: Armée de l'Air (ALA), literally Army of the Air), with strategic transport and paratrooping capability the Cormoran was a large four-engined aircraft with a double-deck fuselage, high-set wing and tricycle undercarriage. Constructed largely of light-alloys with stressed skins and steel high stress components the Cormoran had a conventional tail unit with tailplane attached to the extreme rear of the fuselage and fin also. The cockpit was situated forward of the wing leading edge above the forward fuselage which also had large clamshell doors to the 150 m^{3} (5,297 cu ft) lower deck cargo compartment. Passengers, paratroops and stretchers were to have been carried in both the lower cabin and the upper cabin, which was on the same level as the cockpit aft of the wing. The retractable twin-wheeled undercarriage legs retracted into the rear of the inboard engine nacelles and the underside of the forward fuselage.

== History ==
After the fuselage of the first prototype was displayed at the 1946 Salon d'Áéronautique in Paris on November 15, 1946, the first flight was delayed due to hydraulic problems on the landing gear. The first prototype Nc.211-01 was ready to fly in July 1948, making its first and only flight on 20 July 1948 at Toussus-le-Noble. During the flight a mismatch between flaps and tailplane/elevators caused the crash of the aircraft with the loss of all five on board.

Flight testing of the first production aircraft, from 9 April 1949, quickly revealed less than sparkling performance, leading to loss of confidence in the aircraft's ability to meet the requirement, (and possibly the safety of the design), resulting in cuts to the contract to ten production airframes. Flying with this aircraft ceased on 7 July 1949 with approximately 30 hours total flying time, after which the aircraft was used to house radio transmitters on the airfield at Villacoublay until it was scrapped circa 1972/3. All remaining aircraft and components were scrapped at the Aérocentre factory at Bourges or at Billancourt airfield.

== Variants ==
Data from:

NC.210
The initial design powered by 4x 1,641 kW (2,200 hp) Gnome-Rhône 18R 18-cylinder radial engines. Not built.
NC.211
The proposed production aircraft powered by 4x 1,193 kW (1,600 hp) SNECMA 14R 14-cylinder radial engines. One prototype and one production aircraft completed with nine more partially completed.
NC.212
A proposed version to have been powered by 4x 1,476 kW (1,980 hp) Bristol Hercules 730 14-cylinder sleeve-valve radial engines.
NC.213
A proposed version to have been powered by 4x 1,305 kW (1,750 hp) Junkers Jumo 213 inverted V-12 engines.

== Specifications (NC.211) ==
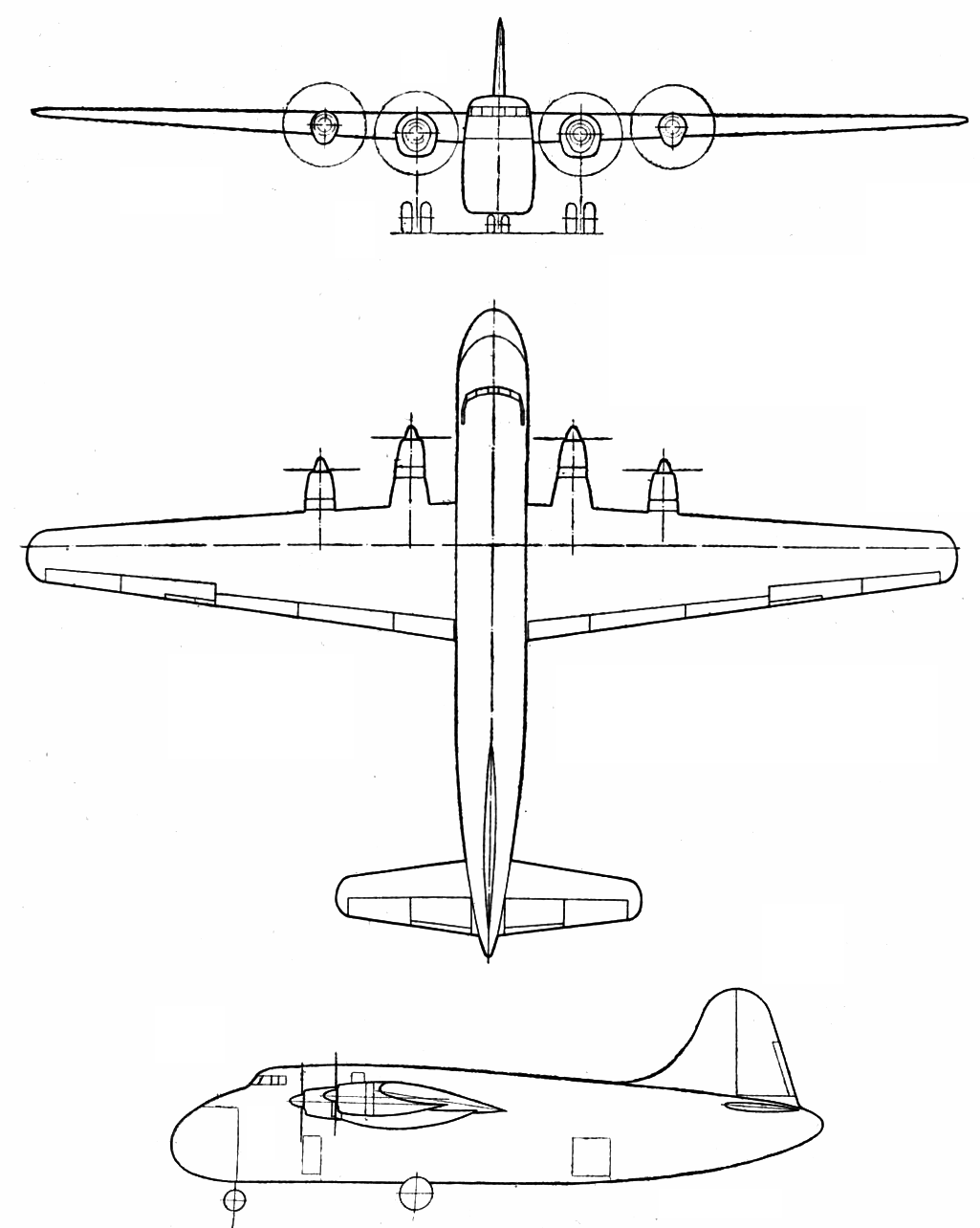
SNCAC NC 211 3 view (modified) from L'Aerophile magazine, July 1946

Data from French Postwar Transport Aircraft

General characteristics

- Crew: 5
- Capacity: 12,000 kg (26,455 lb) payload, 76 paratroops, 60 stretchers or 100-150 passengers (civil)
- Length: 30.5 m (100 ft 1 in)
- Wingspan: 44 m (144 ft 4 in)
- Height: 10.7 m (35 ft 1 in)
- Wing area: 200 m^{2} (2,200 sq ft)
- Empty weight: 25,625 kg (56,493 lb)
- Gross weight: 42,250 kg (93,145 lb)
- Powerplant: 4 × SNECMA 14R 14-cyl. two-row air-cooled radial piston engines, 1,200 kW (1,600 hp) each at 2,600 rpm with 47.2 in (1,199 mm) Hg / +8.6 psi (59,295 Pa) boost for take-off
- Propellers: 3-bladed, 4 m (13 ft 1 in) diameter

Performance

- Maximum speed: 390 km/h (240 mph, 210 kn) at 3,000 m (9,843 ft)
- Cruise speed: 288 km/h (179 mph, 156 kn) at 3,000 m (9,843 ft)
- Range: 1,000 km (620 mi, 540 nmi) with full payload
- Range with 9,600 kg (21,164 lb) payload: 2,000 km (1,243 mi; 1,080 nmi)
- Service ceiling: 8,000 m (26,000 ft)
- Wing loading: 210 kg/m^{2} (43 lb/sq ft)
- Power/mass: 0.0284 kW/kg (0.0369 hp/lb)
