= 1947 BOAC Douglas C-47 crash =

Aircraft crash in Kent, England

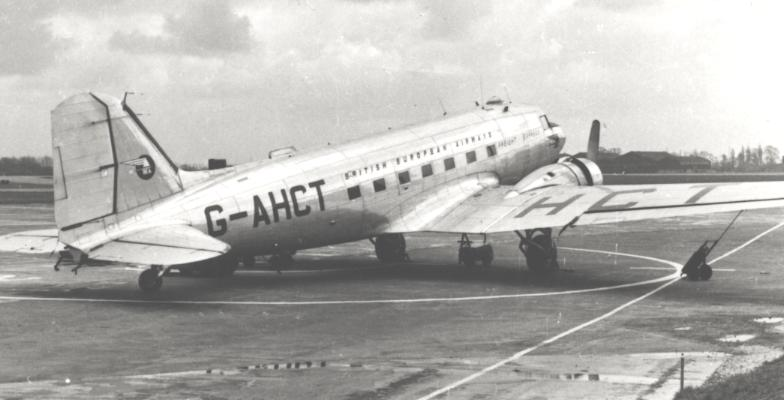
- A Douglas DC-3 of British European Airways, similar to the accident aircraft.

Accident
- Date: 11 January 1947
- Summary: Multiple issues – crew route inexperience, weather, crew resource management, crew rostering oversight, shortfall in airfield radio capacity, pilot error
- Site: Stowting, Kent, England

Aircraft
- Aircraft type: Douglas C-47A
- Operator: British Overseas Airways Corporation
- Registration: G-AGJX
- Flight origin: Heathrow Airport, London
- Stopover: Bordeaux, France
- Destination: West Africa
- Occupants: 16
- Passengers: 11
- Crew: 5
- Fatalities: 8
- Injuries: 8
- Survivors: 8

The 1947 BOAC Douglas C-47 Crash occurred on 11 January 1947 when Douglas C-47A G-AGJX of British Overseas Airways Corporation (BOAC) crashed into a hill at Stowting, Kent, in southeast England, killing five people outright, with a further three dying from injuries received. The aircraft had been operating a scheduled international flight to West Africa via France. Poor weather caused the aircraft to attempt to divert. After attempts to land at a number of French airports, the pilot decided to return to the England as he was running short of fuel. The aircraft crashed while attempting to land at Lympne Airport.

== Aircraft ==
The accident aircraft was Douglas C-47A G-AGJX, c/n 12014. The aircraft was built in 1942 and served with the United States Army Air Forces as 42-92236. It was later transferred to the Royal Air Force as FL604. On 7 July 1944, it was sold to BOAC and registered G-AGJX. At the time of the accident, the aircraft had flown for 3,898 hours. It had been overhauled the previous month, and a new certificate of airworthiness had been issued on 31 December 1946.

== The flight ==
The aircraft was operating a scheduled international flight from London Heathrow to West Africa, with a stopover at Bordeaux. Both captain and first officer were operating their first operational flight since the previous summer.

The aircraft took off from Heathrow at 09:48 GMT. At 12:09, the aircraft was 4th in line to land at Bordeaux. At 12:28, a weather report for Bordeaux was transmitted to the aircraft. This stated "Visibility 1500 metres, 10/10 60–100 metres, WSW 20 km, Q.F.E. 1007.6". The direction of landing was given as 235°. By 12:30, the aircraft was next in line to land. At 1240, priority was given to a Royal Air Force Avro York, which was flying on only three engines. The aircraft was ordered to fly a circuit of the airfield while the York landed. At 1254, the York landed, but had to backtrack along the runway because the perimeter track was unserviceable. At 12:58, the captain asked for the weather at Toulouse. At 12:59, the weather at Toulouse was sent to the aircraft. This stated "Ceiling 300 metres, visibility 2 km, wind E 10 km". With this report, the captain was informed that he was next in line to land at Bordeaux. The captain then told air traffic control that he was diverting because the weather was below the minimum conditions permissible and asked for the weather at Toulouse. In evidence given to the enquiry, this was corroborated by the crew of British European Airways Dakota G-AGZX, which confirmed that the Toulouse weather was asked for. However, the radio operator recorded in his logbook "1300 hrs, set course for London". The aircraft turned on a heading back to England but then changed course for Paris. At 13:08, the weather at Bordeaux had deteriorated and the Q.G.O. message was sent to the aircraft, indicating that it was now prohibited from landing at Bordeaux.

The listed alternates for Bordeaux were Toulouse and Marignane, although the aircraft was not carrying airfield information for either. At 13:13, a message was sent by radio to Air Traffic Control (ATC) at Gloucester that the aircraft was returning to London. Pieces of paper found in the wreckage of the aircraft stated "E.T.A. London 15:18" and "E.T.A. Le Bourget 14:43". At 13:30, the aircraft changed course for Le Bourget. The captain then contacted Le Bourget and asked for the weather report. Gloucester were not informed of the change in plan until 14:06 when a message was sent that the aircraft was diverting to Le Bourget as the fuel reserve was inadequate to reach London. Some time between 14:10 and 14:15, the captain reported to Gloucester that his endurance was 1 hour 20 minutes and his position was 47°25′N 1°20′E. E.T.A. at Le Bourget was 14:45. At 14:14, Gloucester contacted ATC at Uxbridge and reported that the aircraft was diverting to Le Bourget short of fuel, and requested that the message was passed on to Orly Airport. Orly contacted Le Bourget and requested that the aircraft be given priority for landing.

At 14:34, the captain called Le Bourget and gave his E.T.A. as 14:40, with an endurance of only 45 minutes. At 14:45, Le Bourget suggested that the aircraft land at Cormeilles. Le Bourget had a thunderstorm at the time. The aircraft was not carrying any information about Cormeilles, although BOAC had been informed of the airfield's suitability as an alternative landing site in the Paris area in a translation of a French notice to airmen dated 21 October 1946. The radio operator was unable to raise Cormeilles by radio, partly because he was using the wrong callsign of HTU (Morse · · · · — · · — · — ) instead of HXA (Morse · · · · — · · — · ). Cormeilles was handling a de Havilland Dragon Rapide at the time, and could only handle one aircraft at a time by radio. The Dragon Rapide was G-AGWC, which was on a flight from Basel Airport, Switzerland and was also short of fuel. At 15:07, Cormeilles tried to make contact with the aircraft. At 15:14, contact was established and the captain erroneously stated that his endurance was five minutes. At 15:15, a Q.D.M. was asked for from Cormeilles, which was given as 219°. Cormeilles reported that the Q.S.A. was 1. The report concluded that the aircraft had set course for England at or shortly after 15:00.

On entering the cockpit, a steward was told that the aircraft may divert to RAF Manston, which was equipped with FIDO. At 15:24, the aircraft contacted RAF Manston and asked for the weather report. Manston had difficulty communicating with the aircraft, which should have been communicating via Uxbridge ATC. It was not until 15:45 that Manston was able to locate the aircraft's position, which was then 9 miles (14 km) south east of Cap Gris Nez. At 15:52, the captain told Lympne that he had only 25 minutes fuel remaining. A PAN call was made at 15:58, followed by an SOS call at 16:02, giving the aircraft's position as 50°55′N 1°21′E. A further SOS call was made between 16:03 and 16:04 was abruptly curtailed. This was caused by the trailing aerial hitting the ground and breaking off some 2 miles (3.2 km) before the aircraft crashed.

The SOS had been received by both Manston and Uxbridge and lifeboats from Deal, Dungeness and Ramsgate were called out. A Belgian Dakota was asked to keep a lookout. Two Avro Ansons from RAF Thorney Island were also despatched to join the search.

== Accident and aftermath ==
While attempting to land at Lympne, at 16:06, the aircraft crashed into Barley Hill, Hammond's Farm, Stowting, Kent. The aircraft struck the ground at a shallow angle and then bounced for 50 yards (46 m) before crashing into trees. Due to the empty fuel tanks, there was no post-crash fire. The forward fuselage as far back as the cabin door was torn open. The starboard side of the fuselage was also torn open when the aircraft swung violently to port. The tail of the aircraft was largely undamaged. All seats were torn from their anchorages in the floor of the aircraft, although seatbelts remained fastened. Two crew and three passengers were killed in the crash, which was the first for BOAC since 1944.

The alarm was raised by a telephone call to police at Ashford from an officer at Lyminge, which was received at 16:20, followed a few minutes later by another call from an officer at Folkestone. At 17:12, the wreckage was reported as having been located. Villagers from Stowting assisted in the rescue. Ambulances from Ashford, Canterbury, Folkestone and Hythe attended. The injured were taken to Willesborough Hospital. The first of the injured arrived at hospital at 18:00 and all the dead and injured had been extracted from the wreckage of the aircraft by 19:00.

One of the injured crew died on 12 January. Among the injured was Tom Horabin, MP. Another of the injured crew was transferred to the Joyce Green Hospital, Dartford, where he died on 14 January. The death of a passenger on 15 January brought the final toll to eight killed.

An inquest was opened on 13 January at Ashford. It was adjourned until 3 February. After a further adjournment, it concluded on 28 May 1947. A verdict of "accidental death" was returned on each of the victims.

== Investigation ==
A preliminary investigation into the accident was opened on 13 January by the Ministry of Civil Aviation. The investigation was chaired by Lord Nathan, who stated that he was considering whether or not a public enquiry should be held into the accident. In its 16 January 1947 issue, Flight magazine called for a public enquiry to be held. That day, it was announced that a Public Inquiry would be held.

The Public Inquiry opened on 23 January. Air Commodore Vernon Brown was in charge. He stated that the object of the inquiry was not to lay blame, but to discover facts. It was a normal Accidents Investigation Branch inquiry into an accident, with the exception that it was not being held in camera on the instructions of Lord Nathan. There would be no cross-examination of witnesses. The French authorities had co-operated by providing relevant evidence and Max Hymans, head of the Direction Générale de l'Aviation Civile represented the French Government along with other officials. The inquiry was closed on 27 January, concluding that mechanical failure was not the cause of the accident. Liaison between British and French authorities was an area of concern. On 29 January, Edward Percy Smith MP asked in Parliament why the inquiry was taking place when not all the survivors were fit enough to give evidence. In a written answer, Parliamentary Secretary to the Minister of Civil Aviation George Lindgren replied that statements had been taken from nearly all survivors and that it was felt to be in the public interest to proceed without delay.

On 14 February, the inquiry was reopened to hear new evidence. The final report into the accident was published on 7 May. It was established that there was nothing mechanically wrong with the aircraft at the time it crashed, although the engines were operating at idle power. A number of issues were raised, including the rostering of the crew, the captain's failure to ensure that he had all necessary navigational information, the captain's decision to divert to Le Bourget instead of returning straight to England, the inability of Cormeilles to handle two aircraft at once, and the captain's decision to return to England being made too late. Five recommendations were made as a result of the investigation. These were in relation to crewing, crew route familiarisation, provision of route information to crews, the ability of airfields to handle more than one aircraft at a time by radio and the introduction of new systems of working between the United Kingdom and France in respect of the control of air traffic and the hand-over of flights between the two countries. The latter was reported as already being under consideration at the time the report was published.

== See also ==
- Swiss International Air Lines Flight 850, another case of multiple diversions
