= December 1946 =

Month of 1946

<<	December 1946					>>
Su	Mo	Tu	We	Th	Fr	Sa
1	2	3	4	5	6	7
8	9	10	11	12	13	14
15	16	17	18	19	20	21
22	23	24	25	26	27	28
29	30	31

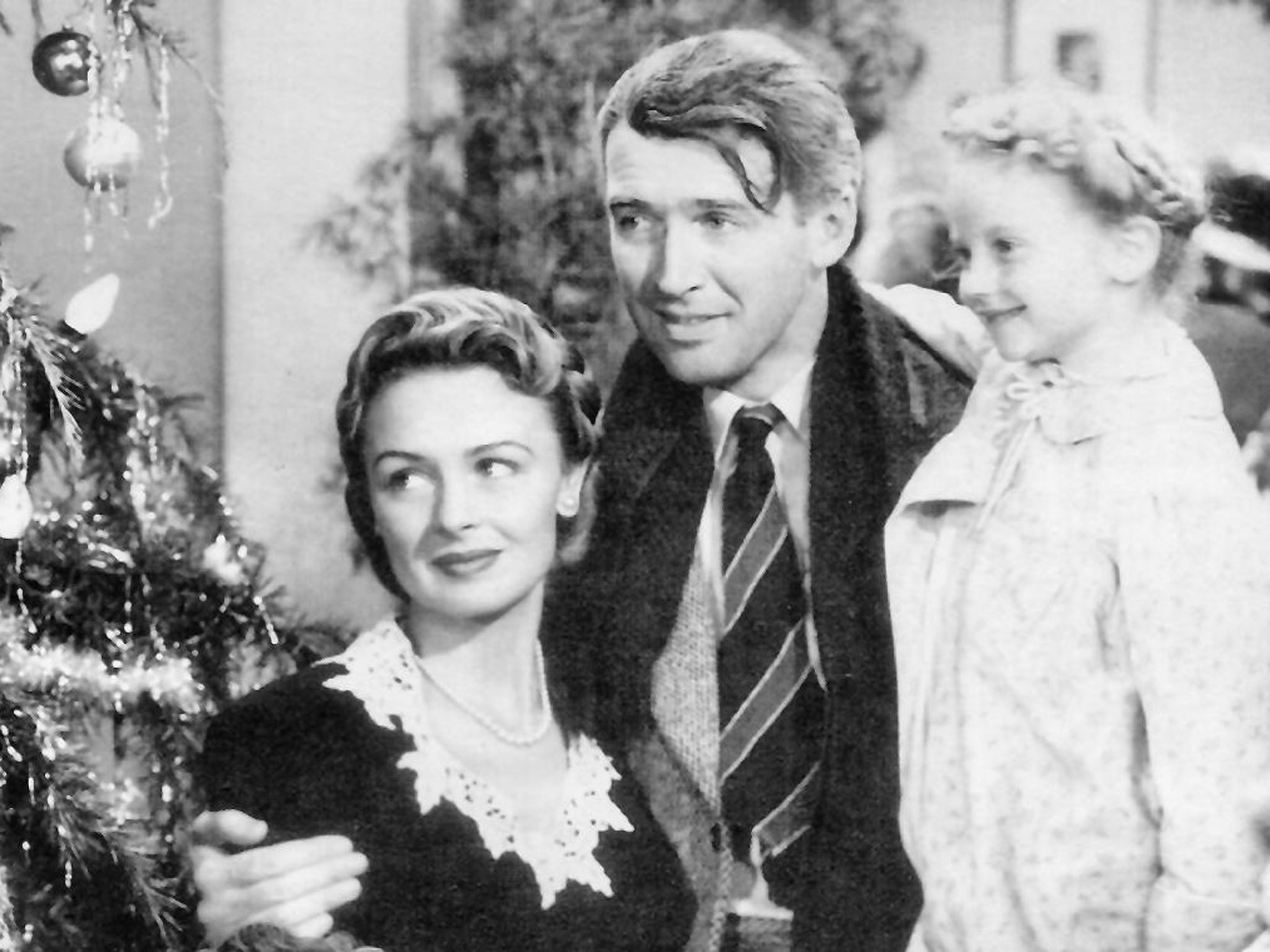
December 20, 1946: It's A Wonderful Life debuts

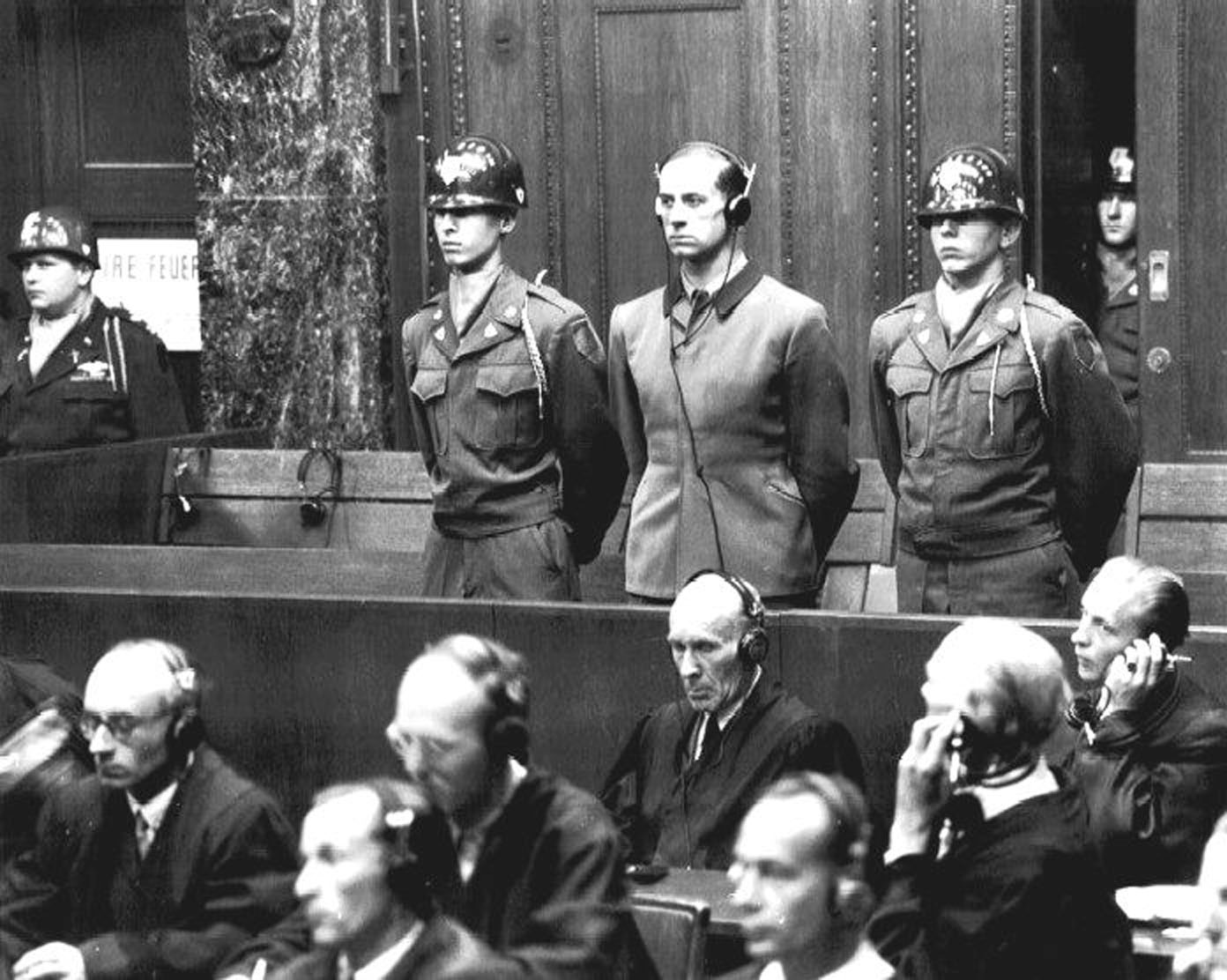
December 9, 1946: Nazi doctors put on trial at Nuremberg

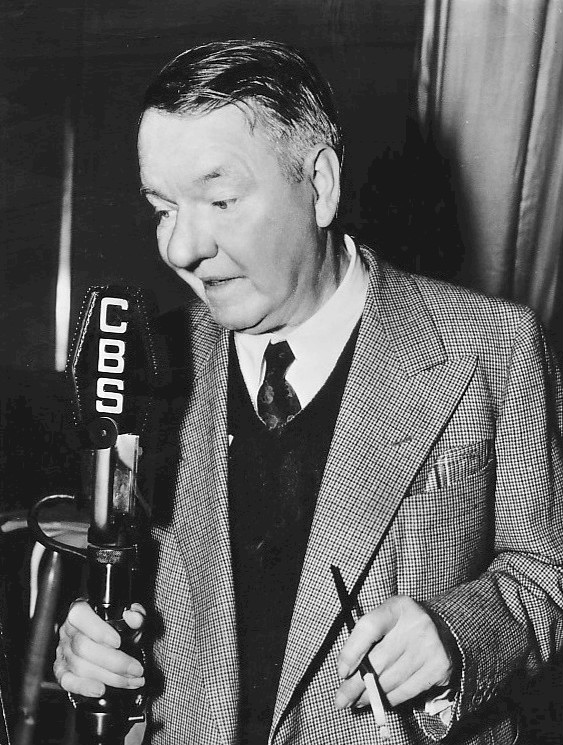
December 25, 1946: W. C. Fields dies at 66

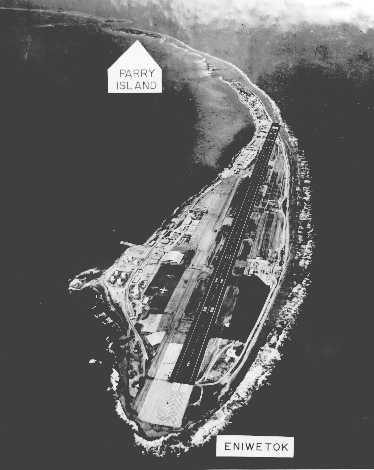
December 21, 1946: Eniwetok Atoll's 142 people removed before atomic bombing

The following events occurred in December 1946:

== December 1, 1946 (Sunday) ==
- Miguel Alemán Valdés was sworn into office as the 46th President of Mexico and as the nation's first civilian president since Venustiano Carranza's death in 1920.

== December 2, 1946 (Monday) ==
- The International Whaling Commission was created by the signing, in Washington, D.C., of the International Convention for the Regulation of Whaling to "provide for the proper conservation of whale stocks and thus make possible the orderly development of the whaling industry". The 15 parties signing represented Argentina, Australia, Brazil, Canada, Chile, Denmark, France, the Netherlands, New Zealand, Norway, Peru, South Africa, the USSR, the UK, and the U.S.
- U.S. Secretary of State James F. Byrnes, and British Foreign Secretary Ernest Bevin jointly announced the "economic fusion" of the American and British occupation zones of Germany, to take place effective January 1, 1947, declaring that "The two zones shall be treated as a single area for all economic purposes." Nicknamed "Bizonia", the Anglo-American occupation zone contained the German states of Schleswig-Holstein, Nordrhein-Westfalen, Niedersachsen, Bavaria, Hesse, and Württemberg-Baden (which later became part of Baden-Württemberg). The French zone would join the merger on April 8, 1949, and the three zones would then become West Germany on May 24 of the same year.
- Born: Gianni Versace, Italian fashion designer; in Reggio Calabria (d. 1997)

== December 3, 1946 (Tuesday) ==
- Notre Dame won the unofficial championship of the 1946 college football season, as the final AP Poll ranked the Fighting Irish #1, with 1731 1/2 points overall (and 100 first-place votes). In second place was Army, with 1,659 1/2 points and 48 first-place votes. Georgia (1,448) and UCLA (1,141) were third and fourth. All four teams were unbeaten in 1946; Notre Dame and Army were unbeaten, but not untied, having played a 0–0 game on November 9.
- The John Ford-directed Western film My Darling Clementine starring Henry Fonda, Linda Darnell and Victor Mature was released.
- Born:
  - Marjana Lipovšek, Yugoslavian/Slovenian opera mezzo-soprano; in Ljubljana
  - Joop Zoetemelk, Dutch cyclist, Tour de France winner 1980; in The Hague

== December 4, 1946 (Wednesday) ==
- U.S. District Judge T. Alan Goldsborough found the United Mine Workers and its president, John L. Lewis, in contempt of court and fined both for continuing the nationwide coal miners strike. Lewis was fined $10,000 personally, and the union was fined $3,500,000 (equivalent to 35 million dollars in 2011). Judge Goldsborough commented that the defiance of an injunction against continuing the strike "is an evil, demoniac, monstrous thing that means hunger and cold and unemployment and destitution and disorganization of the social fabric... if actions of this kind can be successfully persisted in, the government will be overthrown, and the government that would take its place would be a dictatorship, and the first thing the dictatorship would do would be to destroy the labor unions."
- Born:
  - Sherry Alberoni, American voice actress; in Cleveland
  - Yō Inoue, Japanese voice actress; in Tokyo (d. 2003)

== December 5, 1946 (Thursday) ==
- U.S. President Truman issued Executive Order 9808, creating the 16-member Presidential Committee on Civil Rights, chaired by General Electric President Charles E. Wilson. Ten months later, the committee would deliver its report, To Secure These Rights.
- A crowd of 200 residents of an all-white Airport Homes neighborhood rioted when the Chicago Housing Authority attempted to bring in the families of two distinguished African-American veterans in an attempt at integration of Chicago's West Lawn community. On the first day, the crowd attacked the movers who were bringing in the family furniture. Order was restored after 400 city police moved in, but the next day, demonstrators attacked the police. The project would remain all-white.
- U.S. Secretary of State Byrnes announced that, at the request of the United States, Belgium, the Netherlands and Luxembourg had agreed to repatriate German war prisoners as soon as possible, and that he was awaiting an answer from France, where most of the 674,000 POWs had been held since World War II.
- The French submarine 2326, converted to use by the French Navy after its capture from Germany as Unterseeboot U-2326, disappeared in the Mediterranean with 18 men on board, after performing test dives near Toulon. It was believed that the sub had struck a sea mine set adrift following a storm.
- The Korean Central News Agency (KCNA), state news organ for North Korea, was established. Its stated mission was "to turn all members of society into juche communist revolutionaries unconditionally loyal to the Great Leader".
- Born: José Carreras, Spanish Catalan opera singer, and one of The Three Tenors; in Barcelona
- Died: Louis Dewis, 74, Belgian Post-Impressionist painter

== December 6, 1946 (Friday) ==
- The final attempt at resolving the question of the independence of British India, as a single nation, failed. A four-day conference had been held at 10 Downing Street in London with Jawaharlal Nehru of the Congress Party, Muslim League president Muhammad Ali Jinnah, and Sikh leader Sardar Baldev Singh being hosted by Britain's Prime Minister Attlee. "The conversations held by His Majesty's Government... came to an end this evening as Pandit Nehru and Sardar Baldev Singh are returning to India tomorrow morning", the Prime Minister's office began in a press release, closing, "Should the constitution come to be framed by a Constituent Assembly in which a large section of the Indian population had not been represented, His Majesty's Government could not, of course, contemplate— as the Congress have stated they would not contemplate— forcing such a constitution upon any unwilling parts of the country." British India became independent as the separate nations of India and Pakistan (which in turn split in 1971 between Pakistan and Bangladesh).
- The first known reference to the sport of wheelchair basketball was published in the Framingham, Massachusetts News, in a story entitled "Cushing Wins Over Celtics In Wheel-Chair Basketball". The demonstration took place at the Boston Garden, with players from the Cushing Veterans Hospital going up against the Boston Celtics, who were sitting in wheelchairs as well. The Celtics lost, 18–2. In the regular game, before 2,509 fans, the Celtics lost to the Detroit Falcons, 65–61.
- Born: Nancy Brinker, American diplomat and activist; in Peoria, Illinois

== December 7, 1946 (Saturday) ==
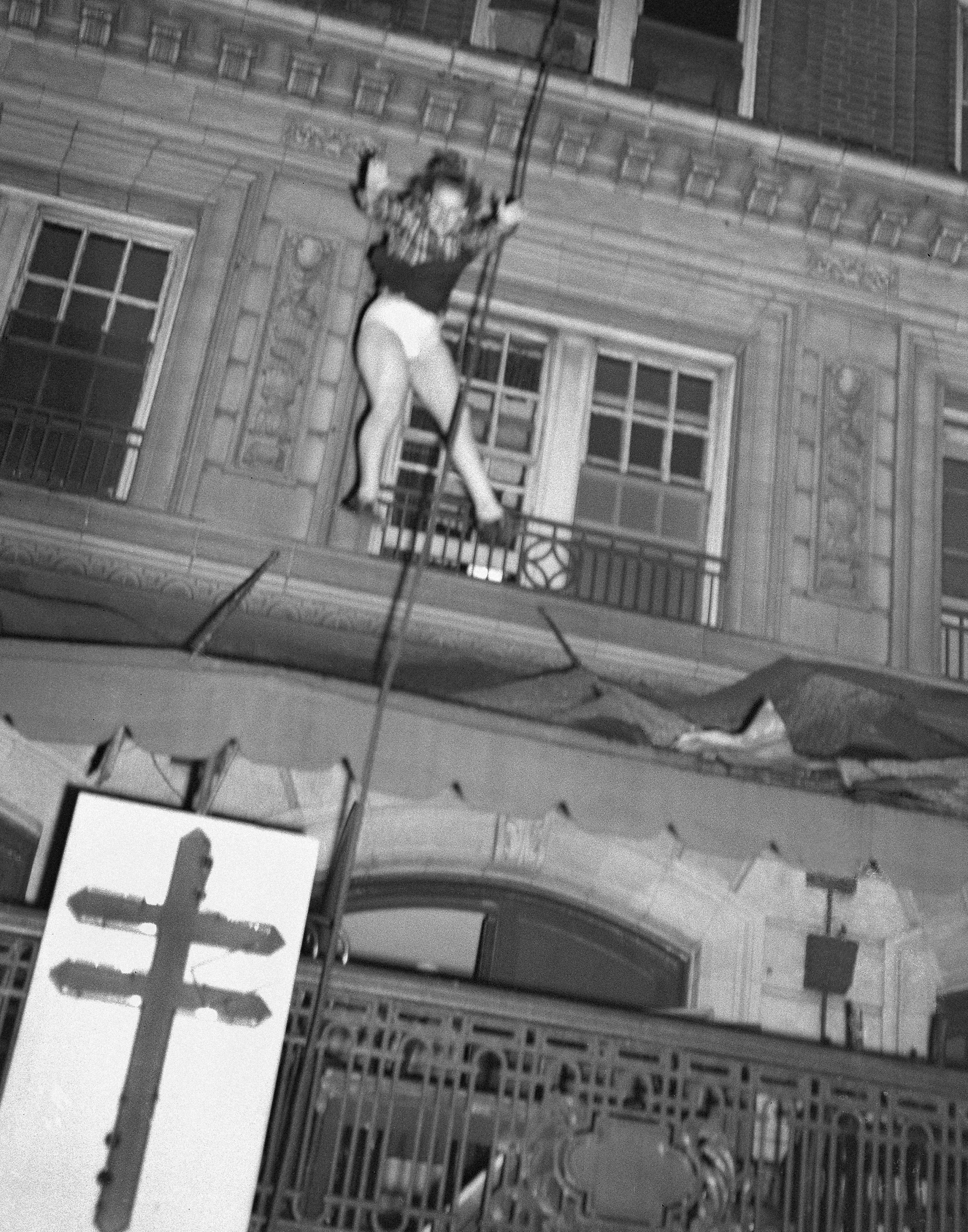
December 7, 1946: Daisy McCumber jumps from window to escape Winecoff Hotel fire; she survived

- An early-morning fire at the Winecoff Hotel in Atlanta killed 119 people. The fire broke out on the third floor of the 15-story building, in front of Room 326, before spreading to the floors above. The Atlanta Fire Department received the first call at 3:42 a.m. Built before strict fire codes were put in place, the luxurious Winecoff Hotel had no alarms, no sprinklers, and no fire escape. Final records concluded that 46 people died of their burns, 40 died of smoke inhalation, and 31 others jumped from the building to their deaths.
- The United Nations emblem was approved by the General Assembly's Resolution 92 ("a map of the world representing an azimuthal equidistant projection centred on the North Pole, inscribed in a wreath consisting of crossed conventionalized branches of the olive tree, in gold on a field of smoke-blue with all water areas in white. The projection of the map extends to 60 degrees south latitude, and includes five concentric circles"). The flag, which has the emblem in white against a light blue background, was adopted on October 20, 1947.
- Facing a huge fine for contempt of court, United Mine Workers President John L. Lewis called an end to a walkout of 400,000 coal miners that he had called on November 20.
- Died:
  - Laurette Taylor, 62, American actress
  - Sada Yacco, 75, Japanese stage actress

== December 8, 1946 (Sunday) ==
- The French liner SS Liberté, formerly the German liner SS Europa, was accidentally sunk, not long after it had been captured from Germany as part of the spoils of World War II. The 49,746-ton ship, third largest ocean liner in the world, broke loose from its moorings, collided with the wreckage of the sunken liner Paris, and went down in the harbor at Le Havre. It was finally put back into service on August 2, 1950.
- Isma'il Sidqi resigned as Prime Minister of Egypt following a failure to guarantee that the Sudan would remain part of the territory administered from Cairo upon full independence of the Anglo-Egyptian Sudan. He was succeeded by Mahmoud an-Nukrashi Pasha.
- Born:
  - John Rubinstein, American TV actor; in Los Angeles
  - Jacques Bourboulon, French photographer

== December 9, 1946 (Monday) ==
- At 11:00 am, in New Delhi, the first Constituent Assembly of India convened, with 323 of the 389 members present. Boycotting the session were the 76 Muslim League members.
- The Nuremberg Doctors' Trial opened with 23 defendants, 16 of whom would be convicted.

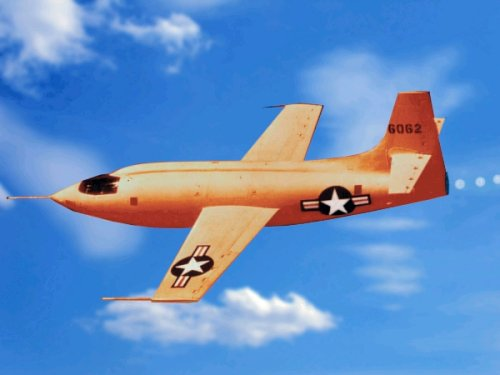
The X-1 rocket plane

- The first powered flight of the Bell X-1 experimental plane was made, by Slick Goodlin, who took off from Edwards Air Force Base in California.
- Born: Sonia Gandhi, Italian-born President of the Indian National Congress Party; as Edvige Antonia Albina Maino in Lusiana, Italy

== December 10, 1946 (Tuesday) ==
- Alger Hiss resigned from the U.S. Department of State, less than two years before he was accused of espionage for the Soviet Union.
- The Italian neorealist war drama film Paisan premiered in Italy.
- Born:
  - Douglas Kenney, co-founder of the National Lampoon; in West Palm Beach, Florida (killed 1980)
  - Thomas Lux, American poet; in Northampton, Massachusetts (d. 2017)
  - Gloria Loring (stage name for Gloria Jean Goff), American singer; in New York City
- Died:
  - Walter Johnson, 59, American baseball pitcher and Hall of Fame inductee, American League most valuable player, 1913 and 1924, twelve-time AL strikeouts leader between 1910 and 1924, holder of the MLB record for most shutouts pitched in a career (110), died of a brain tumor.
  - Damon Runyon, 66, American short-story writer

== December 11, 1946 (Wednesday) ==
- UNICEF, the United Nations International Children's Emergency Fund, was founded as the UN General Assembly adopted Resolution 57 (I).
- With December 11 as the deadline for the United Nations to have a permanent site, real estate developer William Zeckendorf agreed to sell 17 acres of land in Manhattan to John D. Rockefeller, Jr., who, in turn would donate the land to the UN. Zeckendorf made the deal, through architect Wallace Harrison, at 2:00 in the morning while he and his wife were celebrating their wedding anniversary at the Club Monte Carlo.
- Rajendra Prasad was elected as the first President of the Constituent Assembly in India. In 1950, he would become the first President of India.

== December 12, 1946 (Thursday) ==
- The collapse of an adjacent building killed 37 people at a six-story apartment building, on 2545 Amsterdam Avenue in New York City's Washington Heights section. The afternoon before, two boys, aged 13 and 10, had started a fire on the roof of an abandoned ice house on West 184th Street, and bragged about it to their friends. Firefighters put out the flames on the roof and then left, not realizing that a fire continued to smolder in the wooden beams beneath the roof.
- Iranian troops marched into Tabriz, retaking control of the Azerbaijan People's Government that had been created in November 1945, with the backing of occupying Soviet troops.
- Socialist and anti-colonialist Léon Blum took office as the new Prime Minister of France. Historian Stein Tønnesson would later theorize that in the seven days between Blum's entry into office and the Việt Minh's date for launching an attack against the French, war in Vietnam might have been averted.
- The United Nations General Assembly voted, 34–6 (with 13 abstentions) to bar Spain from membership so long as Francisco Franco was in power, and to urge member nations to withdraw their ambassadors from Madrid. The ban would be lifted on November 4, 1950.
- The first meeting of South Korea's Interim Legislative Assembly was held, with 45 appointed members and 45 elected ones, most of whom were right-wing.
- Born:
  - Emerson Fittipaldi, Brazilian Formula One (world champion 1972 and 1974) and Indy car racer (Indianapolis 500 winner 1989 and 1993); in São Paulo
  - Diana Palmer (pen name for Susan Spaeth), American romance novelist; in Cuthbert, Georgia
- Died: Renee Falconetti, 54, French stage and film actress who played the title role in the silent film The Passion of Joan of Arc, died of self-imposed restrictive diet while living in Argentina.

== December 13, 1946 (Friday) ==
- The United Nations General Assembly approved creation of eight trust territories, to be administered by member nations, with the ten-member UN Trusteeship Council to "safeguard the interests of non-self-governing peoples and to try to see that they eventually achieve full independence." The eight territories, which had been League of Nations mandates, were New Guinea (under mandate of Australia); Western Samoa (New Zealand); Ruanda-Urundi, which later split as the nations of Rwanda and Burundi (Belgium); Tanganyika, later merged with Zanzibar as Tanzania (United Kingdom); and the Cameroons (Cameroon) and Togoland (Togo), under a British and French mandate. The full trusteeship committee had approved the eight mandates 35–8 the day before.
- Employees at the Gigant cinema in the Soviet city of Omsk discovered the corpses of 13 young boys. Horrified police investigators found the bodies of an additional seven children at a factory on the outskirts of town, and determined that the murders had been carried out by a gang of juvenile delinquents, whose motive was to steal shoes and jackets.

== December 14, 1946 (Saturday) ==
- The International Labour Organization (ILO), the United Nations Economic and Social Council (UNESCO) and the Food and Agriculture Organization, became the first three UN specialized agencies on the same day.
- The United Nations voted 46–7 to accept the offer by John D. Rockefeller Jr. of $8,500,000 for purchase of the 17 acres of Manhattan real estate bounded by 42nd Street, Franklin D. Roosevelt Drive, 48th Street, and First Avenue, for its permanent location.
- Proposed United States purchase of Greenland from Denmark: An offer was made through diplomatic channels.
- The Aspen Skiing Company opened Aspen Mountain (ski area) in Colorado with Ski Lift No. 1, at 6,800 ft (2.1 km) the world's longest chairlift at this time.
- "Ole Buttermilk Sky" by Kay Kyser hit #1 on the Billboard Honor Roll of Hits.
- Born:
  - Patty Duke, American film and television actress, 1962 Academy Award winner for Best Supporting Actress in The Miracle Worker, 1970 and 1977 Emmy Award winner; in Queens, New York City (d. 2016)
  - Jane Birkin, British actress and singer; in Marylebone, London (d. 2023)
  - Sanjay Gandhi, Indian politician; in New Delhi (killed in plane crash, 1980)

== December 15, 1946 (Sunday) ==
- The first election to the Representative Assembly of French India was held. The election was won by the National Democratic Front of Deiva Zivarattinam, that won 30 out of 44 seats.
- The Chicago Bears scored 10 points in the fourth quarter of the 1946 NFL Championship Game to defeat the New York Giants, 24–14. The game was watched by a record title game crowd of 58,346 at the Polo Grounds. Earlier in the day, the news broke that Giants' quarterback Frankie Filchock and running back Merle Hapes had been offered bribes (which they did not accept, but also failed to report) conditioned on the Bears winning by more than ten points. Hapes was suspended before the game, and Filchock allowed to play. Both were banned from the NFL.
- Three days after retaking its Azerbaijan province, Iran's troops marched into the city of Mahabad, putting an end to the Kurdish Republic of Mahabad that had been created on January 22.
- Vietnam's President Ho Chi Minh sent a cable to France's interim Prime Minister, Léon Blum, asking for negotiations to avert fighting between the two nations. Delivery of the message was delayed, and Blum did not receive it until December 26, after a French ultimatum and a Vietnamese attack had begun what would become a war of more than seven years.
- Born: Carmine Appice, drummer for Rod Stewart, Vanilla Fudge, and Beck, Bogert & Appice; in Brooklyn

== December 16, 1946 (Monday) ==
- Dior, a marketer of luxury fashion outfits for women and founded by French designer Christian Dior and textile magnate Marcel Boussac, began operations with the opening of a store at 30 Avenue Montaigne in Paris.
- Siam joined the United Nations as its 55th member nation. It would change its name to Thailand in 1949.
- The Third String Quartet of Dmitri Shostakovich was first performed, in Moscow. The piece proved to be controversial and was withdrawn from public performance as part of Andrei Zhdanov's campaign against artistic works deemed to be "anti-Soviet", with questions even about whether the musical notes had a subversive message.
- The 1947 NFL draft was held in New York. This was the first year that a lottery system was used to determine which team would get to pick first. The Chicago Bears won the lottery and selected Bob Fenimore of Oklahoma A&M as the #1 overall pick.
- Born:
  - Benny Andersson (Göran Bror Andersson), Swedish musician and one of four founders of ABBA; in Stockholm
  - Trevor Pinnock, English orchestra conductor; in Canterbury
- Died:
  - Lewis J. Valentine, 64, reform-minded NYPD Commissioner from 1934 to 1945, who fired 300 officers and reprimanded or fined 11,000 others.
  - Sulayman al-Murshed, Syrian religious leader who claimed divinity and had 50,000 followers in and around Latakia, was hanged.

== December 17, 1946 (Tuesday) ==
- A new American altitude record was set as a captured German V-2 rocket, No. 17, was launched to an altitude of 116 miles (187 km). The mark was unbroken until February 24, 1949, when a two-stage rocket more than doubled the height, to 250 miles (400 km).
- Born: Eugene Levy, Canadian film and TV comedian; in Hamilton, Ontario

== December 18, 1946 (Wednesday) ==
- The International Monetary Fund established its first par values and exchange rates, pegged against gold and the U.S. dollar, for the currencies of 32 of its member nations, with the 39 nations to pay in their subscriptions before March 1, 1947, for the privilege of borrowing from the World Bank. The Canadian and U.S. dollars were at a 1 to 1 ratio, and the British pound was worth US$4.03.
- Born:
  - Steven Spielberg, American film director and producer, three-time winner of Academy Award for Best Director (for Schindler's List (1994) and Saving Private Ryan (1999)); in Cincinnati
  - Steve Biko, South African anti-apartheid activist; in King William's Town (d. 1977)
- Died: Aline Barnsdall, 64, American heiress and philanthropist

== December 19, 1946 (Thursday) ==
- The Battle of Hanoi began at 8:03 pm local time, when electric power to the city of Hanoi was cut off as a force of 30,000 Việt Minh soldiers launched an attack against French army units in the city. The attack followed a directive made by General Louis Morlière for the Viet soldiers to disarm. Co-ordinated by General Võ Nguyên Giáp, the attackers used mortars, artillery and machine guns in a battle that failed, but began the First Indochina War. Over seven and a half years, the French and their allies lost 172,708 people, more than 500,000 Việt Minh soldiers died, and 150,000 Vietnamese civilians were killed.
- Born:
  - Robert Urich, American television actor; in Toronto, Ohio (d. 2002)
  - Miguel Piñero, Puerto Rican playwright; in Guarbo (d. 1988)
- Died: Paul Langevin, 74, French theoretical physicist who invented a method for generating ultrasonic waves.

== December 20, 1946 (Friday) ==
- Frank Capra's It's a Wonderful Life, with Jimmy Stewart returning to film after completing his World War II service, was released in New York. Despite its Christmas setting, it was not released generally until January 7, and was a money loser in its theatrical release. A failure to renew the copyright in 1974 led to the film being run frequently on television afterward, turning it into one of the most popular Christmas films ever.
- A team of American cryptanalysts, led by Meredith Gardner, decoded a secret cable that had been sent in 1944 to Moscow, and found it contained a list of scientists working on the Manhattan Project, the first of many disclosures that there had been a Soviet espionage operating along atomic bomb researchers at Los Alamos.
- British Prime Minister Clement Attlee announced to the House of Commons that the United Kingdom was prepared to offer Burma its independence. Opposition leader and former Prime Minister Winston Churchill denounced the move by the Labour Party government as hastening "the process of the decline and fall of the British Empire".
- Sugar Ray Robinson won the first of six boxing titles, becoming the world welterweight champion with a decision over Tommy Bell. In 1951, he won the world middleweight title, retired, then won and lost the title several more times between 1955 and 1961.
- Born:
  - Uri Geller, Israeli psychic and magician; in Tel Aviv
  - Lesley Judd, British TV host known for Blue Peter; in London
  - John Spencer, American TV actor known for The West Wing; in Paterson, New Jersey (d. 2005)
  - Dick Wolf, American TV producer known for Law and Order; in New York City.

== December 21, 1946 (Saturday) ==
- The 8.1 M_{w} Nankaidō earthquake killed at least 1,362 people in Japan, with some survivors of the quake being killed 71 minutes later in a tsunami. The quake occurred at 4:19 in the morning local time (1919 hrs on December 20 UTC), and at 5:30 am, a wall of water struck the islands of Shikoku and Honshū, followed by five more waves over the next three hours. The town of Kushimoto, with 10,000 residents, was reported washed away.
- The 142 residents of the Enewetak Atoll in the Marshall Islands were relocated by the United States government to the Ujelang Atoll, in order for Enewetak (spelled at the time Eniwetok) to be used for nuclear testing.
- "The Old Lamp-Lighter" by Sammy Kaye topped the Billboard Honor Roll of Hits.
- Born:
  - Carl Wilson, American rock guitarist for The Beach Boys; in Hawthorne, California (d. 1998)
  - Brian Davison, Rhodesian-born British cricketer, bowler for the Rhodesia national cricket team; in Bulawayo, Southern Rhodesia
- Died: Eugene Talmadge, 62, who had been elected in November to a four-year term as Governor of Georgia, died less than a month before he was scheduled to take office. Both his running mate, Lieutenant Governor-elect Melvin E. Thompson and Talmadge's son, Herman Talmadge, sought to become Governor on the expiration of Governor Ellis Arnall's term. Under various interpretations of the state constitution at the time, Governor Arnall could have continued in office (though he declined to do so), Thompson could take office after being sworn in as Lieutenant Governor, or the legislature could select someone to serve the term. The legislature selected Herman Talmadge, who moved into the Governor's office while Thompson filed suit and maintained his own office as the rightful Governor. Thompson won the suit and was sworn in during March.

== December 22, 1946 (Sunday) ==
- The Havana Conference, a summit of American organized crime bosses, was held at the Hotel Nacional in Havana, Cuba, owned by Meyer Lansky. The occasion was the return of Lucky Luciano from Italy, where he had been deported in February. Luciano, most powerful American mobster, accepted expensive tributes from the visitors, brokered a truce between Albert Anastasia and Vito Genovese, discussed establishing a new route for the trafficking of heroin, and planned the fate of rival boss Bugsy Siegel. Siegel would be murdered on June 20, 1947.
- The Cleveland Browns won the very first All-America Football Conference championship, defeating the New York Yankees (AAFC), 14–9, before a home crowd of 40,469. The Browns trailed, 9–7, with less than five minutes left in the game.
- The Prinz Eugen, the only German warship to survive World War II, capsized and sank in the Kwajalein Lagoon after being towed and set adrift. The cruiser withstood the Able and Baker atomic bomb tests of Operation Crossroads in July 1946, but was heavily irradiated and no longer useful. It went down at 12:43 pm.

== December 23, 1946 (Monday) ==
- A record was set for the most persons to ride the New York City Subway in a single day, with almost nine million (8,872,244) persons passing through the turnstiles—a number, notes one author, "not likely ever to be broken, by New York or any other city".
- The University of Tennessee men's basketball team, in Pennsylvania to play Duquesne University, refused to go through with the game because Duquesne's coach would not agree to bench its African-American freshman, Chuck Cooper. Only three days earlier, Cooper had scored the winning basket in a game in Louisville, Kentucky, against Morehead Teachers College.
- The German scientific publisher Akademie Verlag was founded at the German Academy of Sciences in East Berlin, functioning as the largest publisher in East Germany during that nation's existence from 1949 to 1990, and was later privately acquired.
- Born:
  - Susan Lucci, American TV soap opera actress known for All My Children); in Scarsdale, New York
  - Edita Gruberová, Slovak opera soprano; in Bratislava, Czechoslovakia (d. 2021)
- Died: John A. Sampson, 69, American gynecologist

== December 24, 1946 (Tuesday) ==
- The French Fourth Republic came into existence at 3:11 pm in Paris as the new Council of the Republic, replacing the former French Senate under the new constitution, convened. Jules Gasser, who had been senior member of the Senate that had existed until the Nazi occupation in 1940, presided over the opening session, which lasted 25 minutes. The Fourth Republic, which followed the First (1793–94), Second (1848–52), Third (1871–1940), lasted until 1958, when it was supplanted by the current Fifth Republic.
- Born:
  - Brenda Howard, American lesbian rights activist; in the Bronx (d. 2005)
  - Daniel Beretta, French voice actor known for dubbing the films of Arnold Schwarzenegger (d. 2024).

== December 25, 1946 (Wednesday) ==
- The Soviet Union first achieved a self-sustaining and controlled nuclear chain reaction, at the F-1 uranium-graphite nuclear reactor at Moscow, at 6:00 pm local time. The team was guided by Soviet physicist Igor Kurchatov, and the reactor still operates at the Kurchatov Institute, renamed in his honor. The first controlled reaction had been achieved four years earlier, on December 2, 1942, at the University of Chicago. Soviet control of nuclear energy was followed by the successful test of its first nuclear bomb on August 29, 1949.
- The new Constitution of the Republic of China was adopted by the Constituent Assembly in Nanjing, where the Kuomintang government of Chiang Kai-shek was operating during the Chinese Civil War, and is still in effect for the Republic on the island of Taiwan.
- Born:
  - Jimmy Buffett, American singer known for "Margaritaville"; in Pascagoula, Mississippi (d. 2023)
  - Larry Csonka, American NFL player and Hall of Famer; in Stow, Ohio
- Died: W. C. Fields, 66, American actor and comedian, died at 12:03 pm at the Los Encinas sanitarium in Pasadena, California, where he had been hospitalized for 14 months.

== December 26, 1946 (Thursday) ==
- The Pink Flamingo Hotel and Casino opened on the Las Vegas Strip, the first of a new type of luxurious gambling resort that would transform Las Vegas. Mobster Bugsy Siegel, who went millions of dollars over budget on money borrowed from other organized criminals in building the Flamingo, scheduled the opening for the day after Christmas, but most of the hotel rooms were not ready to be occupied, and most of the celebrities, scheduled to fly in for the inaugural event, were kept away by rainstorms in Los Angeles. During the first few weeks, the casino lost $300,000 more money than it took in. Siegel, who had already offended many of his fellow mobsters, was murdered less than six months later.
- Ernie Adamson, lead counsel for the U.S. House Un-American Activities Committee (HUAC), released a report that he had made to the committee, charging that 17 of the labor unions of the Congress of Industrial Organizations (CIO) were dominated by Russian agents and that plans were being made for Communist revolution in the United States. Adamson charged further that the Library of Congress was "a haven for aliens and foreign-minded Americans". The HUAC had not yet read, let alone approved the report, which did not have specific information, and fired Adamson.
- Giorgio Almirante founded the Movimento Sociale Italiano (MSI) (Italian Social Movement), a political party advocating the goals of Benito Mussolini's National Fascist Party.

== December 27, 1946 (Friday) ==
- At Melbourne, the United States won the finals of the first Davis Cup tournament to be held since 1939. Technically, the event was the very first Davis Cup, after having officially been called the International Lawn Tennis Challenge since 1939. The U.S. team of Jack Kramer and Ted Schroeder beat Australia's John Bromwich and Adrian Quist in straight sets (6–2, 7–5, 6–4).
- Born: Janet Street-Porter, British newspaper editor and TV news presenter; as Janet Bull, in London

== December 28, 1946 (Saturday) ==
- From China, General George C. Marshall notified U.S. President Harry S. Truman that his mission to negotiate a ceasefire between the Nationalist and Communist factions had failed.
- The government of Romania acquired state ownership of the National Bank of Romania, which had been a private institution since its founding in 1880.
- Born: Edgar Winter, American rock musician and composer of the 1972 hit song "Frankenstein"; in Beaumont, Texas,
- Died: Carrie Jacobs-Bond, 82, American singer and songwriter, including the 1901 hit song "I Love You Truly"

== December 29, 1946 (Sunday) ==
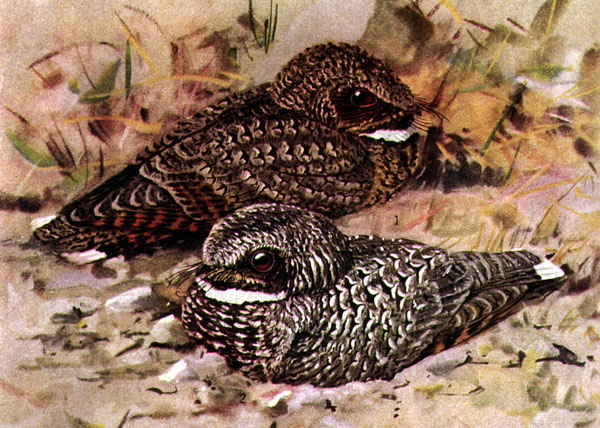
The hibernating bird

- Ornithologist Edmund Jaeger discovered that the common poorwill (Phalaenoptilus nuttallii) hibernates in the winter, the only species of bird to do so. Jaeger and two assistants found a poorwill in a crevice in the Chuckwalla Mountains of California. The discovery wasn't entirely new. The traditional Hopi Indian name for the bird is holchko, "the sleeping one".
- Born:
  - Marianne Faithfull, British singer and songwriter; in London (d. 2025)
  - Laffit Pincay, Jr., winningest (9,530 races) jockey in horse racing history; in Panama City, Panama

== December 30, 1946 (Monday) ==
- The day after a British prison in Palestine gave 18 lashes to punish 17-year-old bank robbery suspect Benjamin Kimchin of the Zionist group Irgun, the group retaliated by kidnapping British Army Major Paddy Brett and three non-commissioned officers from the Metropole Hotel at Nathanya. The three non-coms were whipped 18 times, and Major Brett 20, before being released. The perpetrators were captured and punished, but the British forces never used corporal punishment against the Irgun again.
- Born:
  - Patti Smith, American singer and songwriter known for "Because the Night"; in Chicago
  - Berti Vogts, West German footballer with 96 caps for the West Germany national team; in Büttgen

== December 31, 1946 (Tuesday) ==
- President Harry Truman delivered Presidential Proclamation 2714, which officially ended American hostilities in World War II. The declaration, cited in statutes and regulations concerning the definition of World War II service for purposes of veterans benefits, noted that "a state of war still exists". Treaties ended the war with Germany on October 19, 1951, and with Japan on April 28, 1952, roughly 6 1/2 years after each nation had surrendered.
- The Western film Duel in the Sun starring Jennifer Jones, Joseph Cotten and Gregory Peck premiered in Los Angeles.
- The film noir Dead Reckoning starring Humphrey Bogart and Lizabeth Scott premiered in San Francisco.
- Born: Diane von Fürstenberg, Belgian fashion designer and entrepreneur; as Diane Halfin, in Brussels
