= Franco-Thai settlement treaty of 1946 =

1946 treaty between France and Siam

The Settlement Agreement between France and Siam was concluded in Washington DC on November 17, 1946 in order to settle the consequences of the Franco-Thai War of 1940-1941. The agreement went into effect on the day of its conclusion and was registered in the United Nations Treaty Series on October 16, 1959.

== Causes ==
Following the German occupation of France in 1940, French control over the colonies in East Asia was considerably weakened, and this was used by the leaders of the Japanese Empire to impose on the French government in Vichy arrangements that allowed the stationing of Japanese forces in various parts of Indochina for the purpose of planning a new war against the British Empire and the United States. As part of that policy, the Japanese government supported Siamese efforts to conquer some territories adjacent to the Kingdom of Siam in return for Siamese consent to station there Japanese troops. This led to Japanese support of the Siamese position during the brief war that erupted in October 1940, and on May 9, 1941 a Franco-Siamese peace treaty was signed in Tokyo that gave Siam control over parts of Indochina. Following the surrender of the Japanese Empire in August 1945, the Siamese government strove to restore its relations with the Allied Powers in order to avoid harsh penal policy. Due to US support, Siam received relatively lenient conditions as a defeated country, and the Anglo-Thai Peace Treaty and the Australian–Thai Peace Treaty refrained from depriving Siam of parts of the country as existed prior to 1941.

== The Treaty ==
With US mediation, the Franco-Siamese Settlement Treaty was signed in November 1946. Its clauses constituted a peace treaty, even though the term itself was not used in the treaty. The peace treaty of May 1941 was annulled by the new treaty. The Siamese government ceded to France all the territories taken during the Franco-Thai war, and diplomatic relations between the two countries were reestablished. The French government agreed to promote Siamese membership in the United Nations.
