= November 1946 =

Month of 1946

<<	November 1946					>>
Su	Mo	Tu	We	Th	Fr	Sa
					1	2
3	4	5	6	7	8	9
10	11	12	13	14	15	16
17	18	19	20	21	22	23
24	25	26	27	28	29	30

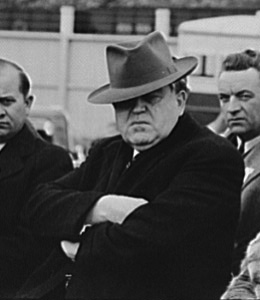
November 20, 1946: UMW President Lewis orders nationwide walkout of coal miners

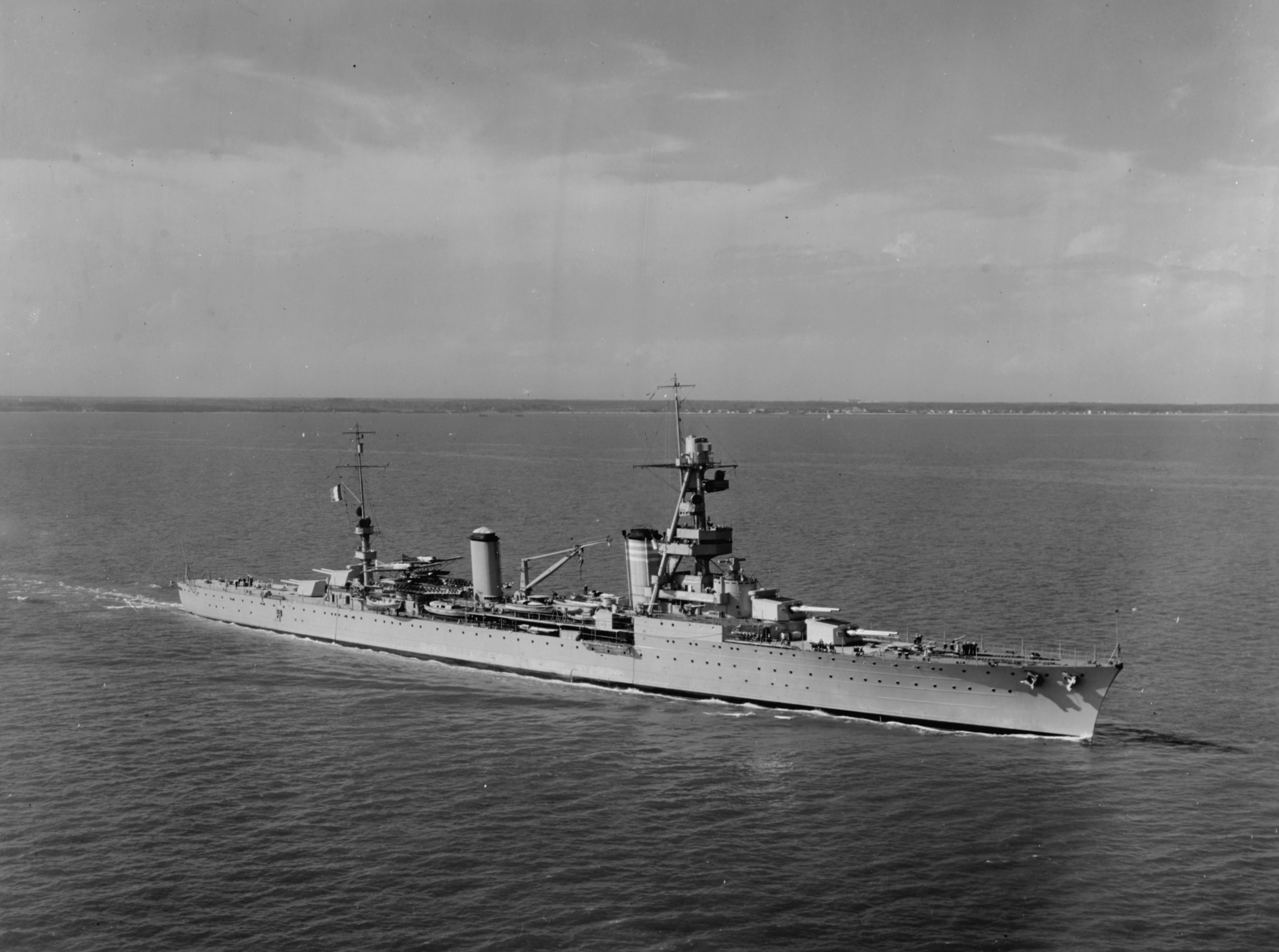
November 23, 1946: French Navy battlecruiser Suffren fires artillery shells into Haiphong, kills thousands of Vietnamese civilians

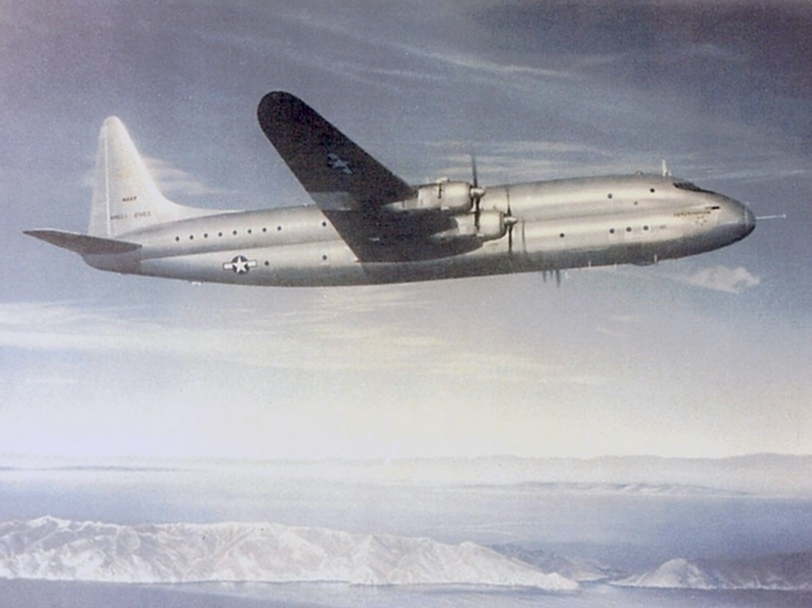
November 9, 1946: The 92-ton airplane Constitution makes its first flight

The following events occurred in November 1946:

== November 1, 1946 (Friday) ==
- In what the National Basketball Association (NBA) credits as its first game, the New York Knicks defeated the Toronto Huskies 68–66. The only game scheduled for the opener of what was then called the Basketball Association of America took place in Canada. Ossie Schectman of the Knicks scored the first points in the first game. The night before, the first exhibition game of the season for the National Basketball League (which would merge with the BAA to form the NBA) saw the pro debut of George Mikan, who scored 19 points for the Chicago Gears in a 55-50 loss to the Rochester Royals.
- At Kraków, Archbishop Adam Sapieha personally ordained 26-year-old Karol Wojtyla as a Roman Catholic priest. Father Wojtyla's career would see him rise through the hierarchy of the Church, becoming Pope John Paul II in 1978.
- In what has been described as "the beginning of modern accelerator technology", a beam of alpha particles was accelerated at the synchrotron in Berkeley, California, to generate an unprecedented 350 MeV of energy.

== November 2, 1946 (Saturday) ==
- The derailment of a train killed 28 people in the Soviet occupation zone in Germany near Leipzig, between Altenburg and Zeitz.
- "Rumors Are Flying" by Frankie Carle hit #1 on the Billboard Honor Roll of Hits.
- Born:
  - Giuseppe Sinopoli, Italian conductor and composer; in Venice (d. 2001)
  - Steve Bender, German Eurodisco musician for the group Dschinghis Khan, in Munich, U.S. occupation zone of Germany
- Died: Thomas L. Bailey, 58, Governor of Mississippi, died at the executive mansion in Jackson

== November 3, 1946 (Sunday) ==
- The new Constitution of Japan, which included that nation's renunciation of war, was promulgated by proclamation of the Emperor Hirohito, who had been allowed to keep the Chrysanthemum Throne in return for dropping all claims of divinity. The instrument took effect, by its terms, on May 3, 1947.

== November 4, 1946 (Monday) ==
- The November 16, 1945, charter establishing UNESCO, the United Nations Educational, Scientific and Cultural Organization, took effect after Greece became the 20th nation to ratify it.
- Gabriel González Videla was inaugurated as the 25th President of Chile.
- Born:
  - Laura Bush, First Lady of the United States from 2001-2009; as Laura Lane Welch in Midland, Texas
  - Robert Mapplethorpe, controversial American photographer; in New York City (d. 1989)

== November 5, 1946 (Tuesday) ==
- In the 1946 U.S. midterm Congressional elections, the Republican Party captured control of both houses from the Democrats. In the Senate, a 56-39 advantage for the Democrats gave way to a 51-45 Republican majority, while in the House of Representatives, the Democrats' 242-191 lead was reversed, with the Republicans up 246 to 188. Freshmen Congressmen included Republican Richard M. Nixon of California's 12th district, and Democrat John F. Kennedy of the Massachusetts 11th.
- The Boston Celtics very first home game was preceded by the first smashing of a glass backboard. Boston's Chuck Connors, who would also play major league baseball and become a TV star in The Rifleman, accidentally tore down a poorly fitted rim.
- Born:
  - Gram Parsons (stage name for Ingram Connor III), American country singer; in Winter Haven, Florida (d. 1973)
  - Herman Brood, Dutch rock musician and painter; in Zwolle (d. 2001)

== November 6, 1946 (Wednesday) ==
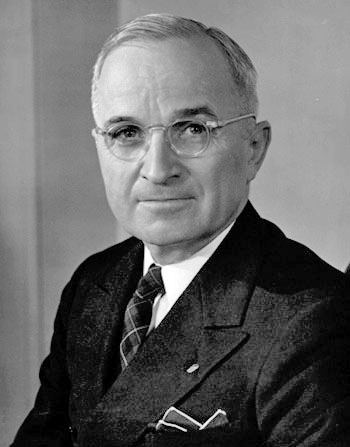
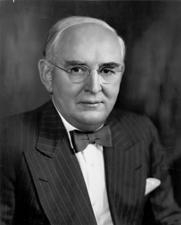
U.S. President Truman and Secretary of State Vandenberg
- The day after the Republican takeover of both houses of Congress, U.S. Senator J. William Fulbright of Arkansas proposed that his fellow Democrat, President Harry S. Truman, should resign to make way for a Republican. Fulbright's proposal, endorsed by the Atlanta Constitution and the Chicago Sun, was that Arthur H. Vandenberg, U.S. Senator from Michigan, be made U.S. Secretary of State (at the time, the Vice-President's office was vacant and the Secretary was next in line for the presidency), after which Truman would step down in favor of President Vandenberg. Truman did not dignify Fulbright's suggestion with a response, but the White House let it be known that the idea would be ignored.
- Born: Sally Field, American TV and film actress; in Pasadena, California

== November 7, 1946 (Thursday) ==
- A major reform of the Japanese writing system was ordered by that nation's Ministry of Education, which eliminated 70% of the kanji symbols that could be used in legal documents, newspapers and magazines. Effective November 16, a list of 1,850 kanji was made from 6,000 traditional ones, with plans to reduce the number further to 881. Words formerly rendered in kanji were replaced with the hiragana syllabic system.
- Birzhan and Sara, composed by Mukan Tulebaev with a libretto by Khazhim Djumaliev, the first Kazakh language opera, was performed for the first time, making its debut on October Revolution Day at the opera house of Alma-Ata in the Soviet Union's Kazakh SSR (now Almaty in Kazkhstan).
- Born: Milton Lee Olive, African-American Medal of Honor recipient; in Chicago (killed in Vietnam, 1965)

== November 8, 1946 (Friday) ==
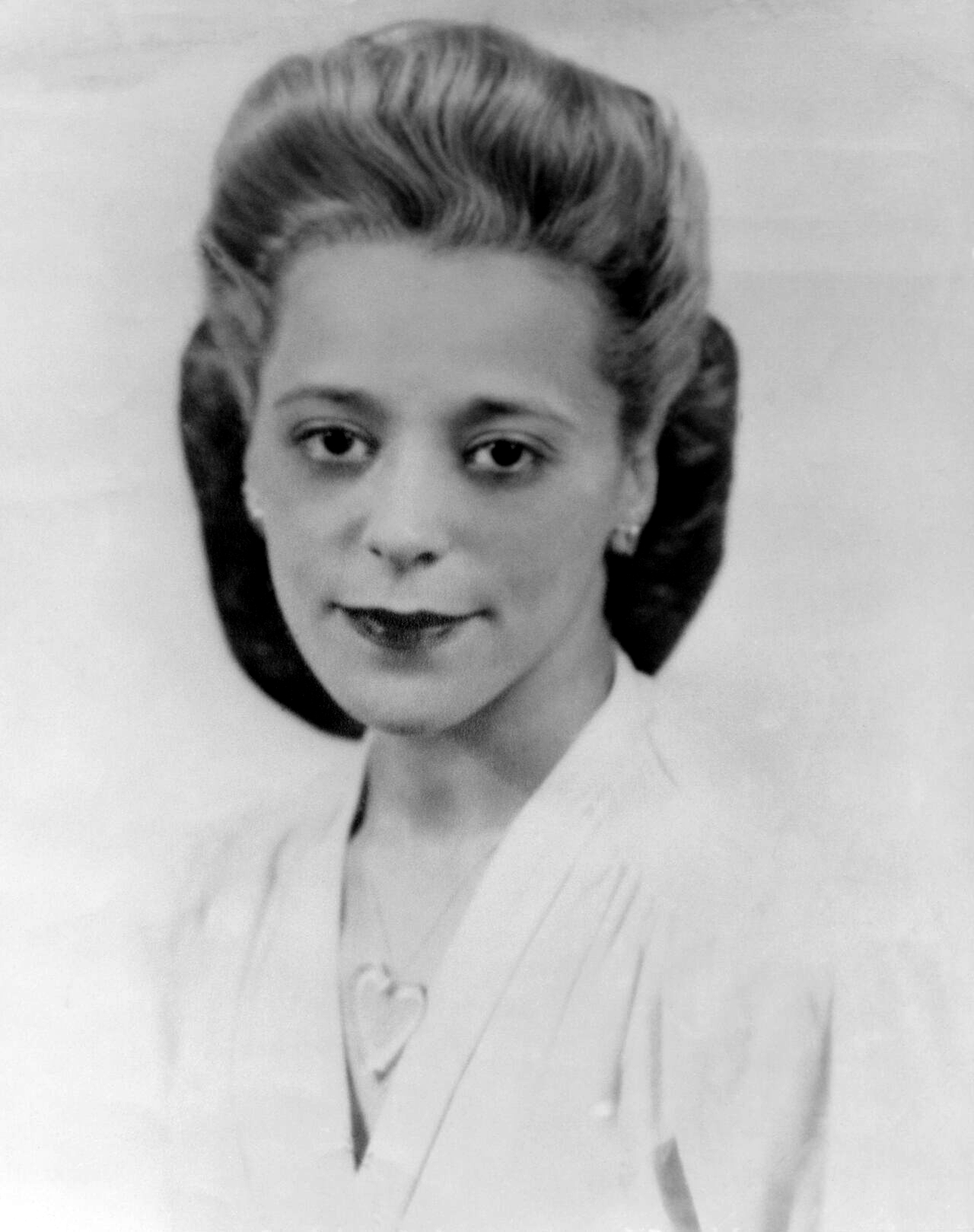
Viola Desmond

- Viola Desmond, a Black Canadian businesswoman and operator of a beauty college, challenged racial segregation in the town of New Glasgow, Nova Scotia and began the racial civil rights movement in Canada. Rather than sitting in the balcony section set aside for minorities, Mrs. Desmond sat in the whites-only section of the Roseland Theatre and then refused to leave. She was arrested, spent the night in jail and was charged with tax evasion for paying a two-cent sales tax on a 20 cent ticket rather than the three-cent tax on a 40 cent ticket. Starting on November 19, 2018, Mrs. Desmond's image replaced that of Sir John A. Macdonald on the Canadian ten-dollar note.
- The government of Japan expelled from office 162,915 persons who had held posts during World War II, ranging from village employees to prefecture chiefs. The names were supplied by Brigadier General Courtney Whitney of the American occupational government.

== November 9, 1946 (Saturday) ==
- Dubbed the "Game of the Century", the first ever between college football's two highest ranked teams, took place before a crowd of 74,000 at New York's Yankee Stadium, with #1 Army facing #2 Notre Dame. The game ended in a 0-0 tie, but brought Army's 25 game winning streak to a halt.
- The Lockheed R6V Constitution, at 92 tons the largest airplane up to that time, made its first flight.

== November 10, 1946 (Sunday) ==

- In voting for France's National Assembly, the French Communist Party (PCF) received a plurality in taking 182 of the 627 seats.
- At least 1,400 people were killed in an earthquake of magnitude 7.3 in the Ancash Region of Peru. Hardest hit was the village of Quiches in the Sihuas Province, and the city of Moyobamba.
- A team led by Igor Kurchatov began work on assembling the Soviet Union's first nuclear reactor.
- The very first Wildfowl & Wetlands Trust wetland reserve, created by Sir Peter Scott, opened at Slimbridge, Gloucestershire.
- Born: Alaina Reed Hall; American TV actress, as Bernice Reed in Springfield, Ohio (d. 2009)
- Died: Nguyen Van Thinh, President of Cochin-China, hanged himself at his apartment in Saigon after being unable to meet with French Indochina Commissioner Georges Thierry d'Argenlieu.

== November 11, 1946 (Monday) ==
- Margaret Truman, the 22-year-old daughter of the President of the United States, made her operatic debut, singing at the opening of the 62nd season of the Metropolitan Opera in New York.
- Born: Corrine Brown, African-American Congresswoman from 1993 to 2017; in Jacksonville, Florida
- Died: Nikolai Burdenko, 70, Soviet pioneer in neurosurgery

== November 12, 1946 (Tuesday) ==
- The Disney film Song of the South, first to combine live action with animation and most popular movie of 1946, premiered at the Fox Theater in Atlanta.
- In Chicago, a branch of the Exchange National Bank (now part of the LaSalle Bank) opened "Autobank", a set of ten drive-up teller windows.
- Died: Madan Mohan Malaviya, 84, Indian patriot

== November 13, 1946 (Wednesday) ==
- Meteorologist Vincent Schaefer, a researcher for the General Electric company, made the first successful test of cloud seeding as a means of weather control. Taking off in an airplane from Schenectady, New York, Schaefer dropped six pounds of dry ice pellets into the clouds at 14,000 feet over Pittsfield, Massachusetts. Within two minutes, snow flakes began falling. The snow didn't reach the town below, evaporating at about 11,000 feet, but Schaefer, who had earlier discovered a laboratory process for artificially making snow, demonstrated that the process could be duplicated on a large scale.
- Born: Wanda Coleman, African American author; in Los Angeles (d. 2013)

== November 14, 1946 (Thursday) ==
- American embassy chargé d'affaires George R. Merrell, for the United States, and Jawaharlal Nehru of the interim government of India, signed the Air Transport Services Pact in New Delhi, clearing the way for U.S. airlines to fly around the world.
- Died: Manuel de Falla, 69, Spanish composer

== November 15, 1946 (Friday) ==
- At 3:00 pm, at the residence of Indonesian Vice-President Sutan Sjahrir, the Linggajati Agreement was initialed at Malang, by Sjahrir with former Netherlands Prime Minister Willem Schermerhorn. Mediated by Lord Killearn of the United Kingdom, the agreement provided for a ceasefire, and control of Java, Sumatra and the Kalimantan portion of Borneo by the Republic of Indonesia, while the colonial administration of the Dutch East Indies would continue on Sulawesi, the Lesser Sunda Islands, West New Guinea, and the Maluku Islands.;
- The National Assembly of the Republic of China convened at Nanjing with hopes that a new constitution could be created that would be agreeable to both the Nationalist and Communist parties. The Communists and the China Democratic League boycotted the meeting, which drafted a constitution for the Republic of China that would eventually be limited to the island of Taiwan.

== November 16, 1946 (Saturday) ==
- At Johnstown, Pennsylvania, the Evangelical United Brethren Church (EUB) was created by merger of Evangelical Church and the United Brethren in Christ. On April 23, 1968, the EUB's 750,000 members would combine in a merger with the Methodist Church to create the United Methodist Church.
- Born:
  - Mahasti, Iranian pop singer; as Eftekhar Dadehbala in Tehran (d. 2007)
  - Terence McKenna, American psychedelic writer, in Paonia, Colorado (d. 2000)

== November 17, 1946 (Sunday) ==
- The Franco-Siamese Agreement was signed in Washington, D.C., annulling the Tokyo convention that had ended the Franco-Thai War. In return for its entry into the United Nations, the Kingdom of Thailand returned territory won in the war, ceding the provinces of Pak Lay and Bassac (Champasak) to Laos, and the provinces of Battambang and Siem Reap to Cambodia.
- Born: Terry E. Branstad, Governor of Iowa 2011 to 2017, later U.S. Ambassador to China (2017-2020); in Leland, Iowa

== November 18, 1946 (Monday) ==
- Following his participation at a criminal trial of two white men in Columbia, Tennessee, African-American lawyer Thurgood Marshall was arrested by city police and narrowly avoided a lynch mob. With the aid of friends, the future U.S. Supreme Court justice managed to get out of town and back to Nashville.
- Born: Joe Dante, American film director known for Gremlins; in Morristown, New Jersey
- Died:
  - Jimmy Walker, 65, Mayor of New York City from 1926 to 1932
  - Donald Meek, 68, Scottish-born character actor who often portrayed meek persons

== November 19, 1946 (Tuesday) ==
- Led by Prime Minister Petru Groza, the Romanian Communist Party won 79.86% and 379 of the 414 seats in voting for Romania's Parliament, in an election characterized by intimidation and fraud.
- The United Nations Organization admitted its first new members since 1945, with the addition of Afghanistan, Iceland, Sweden and Thailand bringing the total to 102.
- Zhou Enlai departed Nanjing and returned to Yan'an, bringing to an end the negotiations between the Communists and the Kuomintang. Zhou and nine other Communist officials were provided safe passage on an American aircraft provided by General George C. Marshall, who arranged for U.S. transport of all remaining Communist leaders from Nationalist held cities.

== November 20, 1946 (Wednesday) ==
- Coal miners across the United States walked out on strike after United Mine Workers President John L. Lewis defied a court injunction and ordered members to cease work. In all, 400,000 miners stopped coal production a month before winter was to begin. As the strike wore on, American workers in related industries were laid off, nations dependent on American coal faced their own economic crises, and a worldwide crisis was envisioned. Then, on December 7, Lewis abruptly ordered the miners back to work, at least until the end of March.
- A minor incident in French Indochina set in motion a chain of events that would lead to nearly 30 years of war in Vietnam, first with France and then with the United States. A French patrol boat seized a Chinese junk as it sailed into the harbor of Haiphong, smuggling a cargo of gasoline. The Viet Minh guerrilla army captured the French boat and its crew, and the French Army responded with an ultimatum that expired two days later with deadly consequences.
- Students at Arizona State University (at that time "Arizona State College at Tempe" or Tempe State) voted 819-196 to change the name of their sports teams from the "Bulldogs" to the "Sun Devils".
- Born:
  - Duane Allman, American rock guitarist; in Nashville (d. 1971)
  - Judy Woodruff, American television reporter for NBC News; in Tulsa, Oklahoma
- Died: Timothy Pflueger, 54, American architect

== November 21, 1946 (Thursday) ==
- On a visit to the Navy base at Key West, Harry S. Truman became the first U.S. President to ride underwater in a submarine. Reporters were barred from accompanying the President aboard the captured German submarine U-2513. Along with 22 other people, Truman was taken 440 feet below the surface, and witnessed a secret demonstration of the U-boat's technology, including the "Schnorchel", a Nazi adaptation of the submarine snorkel.
- The drama film The Best Years of Our Lives starring Myrna Loy, Fredric March, Dana Andrews, Teresa Wright, Virginia Mayo and Harold Russell was released.

== November 22, 1946 (Friday) ==
- The film The Best Years of Our Lives, about American veterans returning to civilian life after World War II, had its world premiere, at the Astor Theater in New York City.
- Communist leader Georgi Dimitrov, whose party won 247 of the 465 available seats in parliamentary elections, was named as the new Prime Minister of Bulgaria. Dimitrov, who replaced Kimon Georgiev, had been the Secretary-General of Comintern, and had held Soviet citizenship until 1944.
- Died: Otto Thierack, 57, Reich Minister of Justice in Nazi Germany from 1942-1945, hanged himself before he could be brought before a United States military court in the Nuremberg Judges' Trial.

== November 23, 1946 (Saturday) ==
- As the French light cruiser Suffren sat in Haiphong harbor, Colonel Pierre-Louis Debès delivered an ultimatum at 7:00 a.m., telling the Viet Minh that it had two hours to withdraw its armies from the port and from the French and Chinese sections of the city, or face bombardment. At 9:45, Debès, who had been directed by General Jean Etienne Valluy to give the enemy "une dure leçon" ("a hard lesson") for the events earlier in the week, ordered an attack. The Suffren fired its 8-inch shells into the Vietnamese city, killing soldiers and civilians. The Viet Minh claimed that 20,000 people died, and French Admiral Robert Battet later gave the number of deaths as "no more than 6,000".

== November 24, 1946 (Sunday) ==
- Tomas Berreta was elected the 32nd President of Uruguay, defeating Luis Alberto de Herrara and comedian Domingo Tortorelli.
- Born: Ted Bundy, American serial killer; as Theodore Cowell in Burlington, Vermont (executed 1989)
- Died: László Moholy-Nagy, 56, Hungarian born artist and designer

== November 25, 1946 (Monday) ==
- In response to Republican Party pressure to purge the United States government of suspected Communists, President Truman issued Executive Order #9806, creating the six member "Temporary Commission on Employee Loyalty". On March 21, 1947, Truman would create a more permanent program by Executive Order 9835.
- Missing since 1823, the remains of Mexican conquistador Hernán Cortés were discovered behind a wall in chapel of the Hospital de Jesús Nazareno in Mexico City. Cortés (1485-1547) had conquered the Aztec Empire in 1521 before returning to his native Spain. His body was returned to Mexico in 1562, hidden after that nation declared independence from Spain, and then forgotten for 123 years. The four foot long crystal and gold casket was found two weeks after Spanish antiquarian Fernando Baez found church records that showed its location in the unused room.
- Born:
  - Marc Brown, American children's author, illustrator, and creator, starting 1976, of the Arthur series of books; in Erie, Pennsylvania
  - Atiku Abubakar, Vice President of Nigeria 1999 to 2007
- Died:
  - Henry Morgenthau, Sr., 90, German-born American diplomat
  - George Gandy, 95, American businessman

== November 26, 1946 (Tuesday) ==
- In the Soviet Union, Central Committee investigator Mikhail Suslov began what has been described as "a new page in the history of repression" by recommending the purge of members of the USSR's Jewish Anti-Fascist Committee (EAK). Over the next six years, members of the group were arrested and tortured. On August 12, 1952, thirteen of the most prominent EAK members were executed after being convicted of treason.
- Born: Art Shell, first African-American NFL head coach in the modern era; in Charleston, South Carolina

== November 27, 1946 (Wednesday) ==
- Fidel Castro, a 22-year-old law student at the University of Havana, made his first major speech, denouncing Cuban President Ramón Grau at the Colon Cemetery.

== November 28, 1946 (Thursday) ==
- The 23rd Indian Division, which sustained 407 dead, 808 wounded and 162 missing in what author Martin Gilbert described as "the last Allied casualties" of World War II, completed a mission that had begun two weeks before V-J Day. At the end of the Burma Campaign, the British Empire had ordered 92,000 troops to the Indonesian island of Java, with a deadly assault on September 15, 1945. Allied casualties continued to be sustained as the Indian and British forces set about to disarm 270,000 Japanese troops and evacuate 110,000 Allied prisoners, even as Indonesian and Dutch forces fought each other.

== November 29, 1946 (Friday) ==
- The All Indonesia Centre of Labour Organizations (SOBSI) was founded in Jakarta.
- Johannes Vares-Barbarus, Chairman of the Presidium of the Estonian SSR since 1940 after assisting in Estonia's 1940 annexation to the Soviet Union, was found shot to death in the presidential palace in Kadriorg, Tallinn.
- Born: Suzy Chaffee, American alpine skier and actress; in Rutland, Vermont

== November 30, 1946 (Saturday) ==
- In the annual Army–Navy Game at Philadelphia, a 1-7-0 U.S. Naval Academy nearly upset the 8-0-1 and #1 ranked Army Cadets. Navy was within 3 yards of the goal with 10 seconds left, but game officials failed to stop the clock before another play could be run. When the final Associated Press poll was taken on December 3, Notre Dame took the #1 spot and the unofficial college football championship.
- Born:
  - Marina Abramović, Yugoslavian-born performance artist; in Belgrade
  - Lynne Russell, American news anchor for CNN Headline News, 1983-2001; in Orange, New Jersey
- Died: Gustav Noske, 78, former German Defense Minister and Social Democratic Party official
