= List of Type XXIII submarines =

Type XXIII submarines were small, fast coastal craft, capable of remaining underwater indefinitely, fuel permitting, while at sea. This made them extremely dangerous to allied shipping and much better protected against allied counter-measures. Their main drawback was that they carried only two torpedoes, which severely limited their combat effectiveness. These boats appeared in the last two months of 1944 onward and were too late to have a major effect on the Second World War.

Due to their late arrival, the majority of these coastal submarines were never used in combat, and were scuttled either in Germany or in Operation Deadlight following the end of the war. These boats are listed below with construction and destruction information.

== Type XXIII submarines ==
Boat	Construction				Commanders	Fate
Boat	Laid down	Launched	Commissioned	Shipyard	Commanders	Fate
U-2321	10 Mar 1944	17 Apr 1944	12 Jun 1944	Deutsche Werft, Hamburg	Hans-Heinrich Barschkis	Performed one operational patrol, sinking the British merchant ship Gasray, before surrendering to the Allies. Sunk on 27 November 1945 in Operation Deadlight.
U-2322	22 Mar 1944	30 Apr 1944	1 Jul 1944	Deutsche Werft, Hamburg	Fridtjof Heckel	Performed two operational patrols, sinking the British merchantman Egholm, before surrendering to the Allies. Sunk on 27 November 1945 in Operation Deadlight.
U-2323	11 Apr 1944	31 May 1944	18 Jul 1944	Deutsche Werft, Hamburg	Walter Angermann	Sunk by a naval mine on 26 July 1944. Raised in early 1945 and was still under repairs at Kiel at the time of the German surrender. Broken up on site post-war.
U-2324	21 Apr 1944	16 Jun 1944	25 Jul 1944	Deutsche Werft, Hamburg	Hans-Heinrich Haß; Konstantin von Rappard	Performed two operational patrols before surrendering to the Allies. Sunk on 27 November 1945 in Operation Deadlight.
U-2325	29 Apr 1944	13 Jul 1944	3 Aug 1944	Deutsche Werft, Hamburg	Wolf-Harald Schüler; Kurt Eckel	Surrendered at Kristiansand, Norway. Transferred to Loch Ryan, Scotland for Operation Deadlight and sunk on 28 November 1945.
U-2326	8 May 1944	17 July 1944	10 Aug 1944	Deutsche Werft, Hamburg	Karl Jobst	Performed two operational patrols before surrendering to the Allies, and was taken over by the British as N 35, before being transferred to France in 1946. Lost in an accident on 6 December 1946 at Toulon.
U-2327	16 May 1944	29 Jul 1944	19 Aug 1944	Deutsche Werft, Hamburg	Heinrich Mürl; Werner Müller; Hans-Walter Pahl; Hermann Schulz	Scuttled in Hamburg-Finkenwerder docks on 2 May 1945 as part of Operation Regenbogen. Later raised and broken up.
U-2328	19 May 1944	7 Aug 1944	25 Aug 1944	Deutsche Werft, Hamburg	Hans-Ulrich Scholle; Peter Lawrence	Surrendered to the Allies at Bergen, Norway. Took on water and sank during Operation Deadlight on 27 November 1945 while in tow to scuttling location.
U-2329	2 Jun 1944	11 Aug 1944	1 Sep 1944	Deutsche Werft, Hamburg	Heinrich Schlott	Performed one operational patrol before surrendering to the Allies. Sunk on 28 November 1945 in Operation Deadlight.
U-2330	12 Jun 1944	19 Aug 1944	7 Sep 1944	Deutsche Werft, Hamburg	Hans Beckmann	Scuttled in Kiel harbour on 3 May 1945 as part of Operation Regenbogen. Later raised and broken up.
U-2331	30 Jun 1944	22 Aug 1944	12 Sep 1944	Deutsche Werft, Hamburg	Hans-Walter Pahl	Sunk in a training accident on 10 October 1944. Later raised and towed to Gotenhafen, but was damaged beyond repair while submerged and was scrapped.
U-2332	20 Sep 1944	18 Oct 1944	13 Nov 1944	Germaniawerft, Kiel	Dieter Bornkessel	Scuttled in Hamburg docks on 3 May 1945 as part of Operation Regenbogen. Later raised and broken up.
U-2333	27 Sep 1944	16 Nov 1944	18 Dec 1944	Germaniawerft, Kiel	Heinz Baumann	Scuttled in Gelting Bay on 5 May 1945 as part of Operation Regenbogen. Later raised and broken up.
U-2334	14 Jul 1944	26 Aug 1944	21 Sep 1944	Deutsche Werft, Hamburg	Walter Angermann	Surrendered at Kristiansand, Norway. Transferred to Loch Ryan, Scotland for Operation Deadlight and sunk on 28 November 1945.
U-2335	20 Jul 1944	31 Aug 1944	27 Sep 1944	Deutsche Werft, Hamburg	Karl-Dietrich Benthin	Surrendered at Kristiansand, Norway. Transferred to Loch Ryan, Scotland for Operation Deadlight and sunk on 28 November 1945.
U-2336	27 July 1944	10 Sep 1944	30 Sep 1944	Deutsche Werft, Hamburg	Jürgen Vockel; Emil Klusmeier	Performed one operational patrol before surrendering to the Allies. On 7 May 1945 it sank two Allied merchant ships (Avondale Park and Sneland I) in the Firth of Forth. These were the last ships lost to German submarines in World War II. Surrendered at Wilhelmshaven, Germany. Taken to Lisahally on 21 June 1945 for Operation Deadlight and sunk on 3 January 1946.
U-2337	2 Aug 1944	15 Sep 1944	4 Oct 1944	Deutsche Werft, Hamburg	Günther Behnisch	Surrendered at Kristiansand, Norway. Transferred to Loch Ryan, Scotland for Operation Deadlight and scuttled on 27 November 1945.
U-2338	10 Aug 1944	18 Sep 1944	9 Oct 1944	Deutsche Werft, Hamburg	Hans-Dietrich Kaiser	Sunk by British Beaufighter aircraft during training mission on 4 May 1945. Raised in 1952 and broken up.
U-2339	15 Aug 1944	22 Sep 1944	16 Nov 1944	Deutsche Werft, Hamburg	Germanus Woermann	Scuttled in Gelting Bay on 5 May 1945 as part of Operation Regenbogen. Later raised and broken up.
U-2340	18 Aug 1944	28 Sep 1944	16 Oct 1944	Deutsche Werft, Hamburg	Emil Klusmeier	Destroyed in Royal Air Force bombing raid on 30 March 1945. Later raised and broken up.
U-2341	23 Aug 1944	3 Oct 1944	21 Oct 1944	Deutsche Werft, Hamburg	Hermann Boehm	Surrendered at Cuxhaven, Germany. Transferred to Lisahally, Ireland for Operation Deadlight and scuttled on 31 December 1945.
U-2342	29 Aug 1944	13 Oct 1944	1 Nov 1944	Deutsche Werft, Hamburg	Berthold Schad von Mittelbiberach	Struck a mine north of Swinemünde during convoy operation on 26 December 1944. Wreck was still there in August 1953; blown up in 1954 to clear the seaway and parts taken to shore and broken up.
U-2343	31 Aug 1944	18 Oct 1944	6 Nov 1944	Deutsche Werft, Hamburg	Harald Fuhlendorf; Hans-Ludwig Gaude	Scuttled in Gelting Bay on 5 May 1945 as part of Operation Regenbogen. Later raised and broken up.
U-2344	4 Sep 1944	24 Oct 1944	10 Nov 1944	Deutsche Werft, Hamburg	Hermann Ellerlage	Sunk after collision with U-2336 during a training operation on 18 February 1945. Wreck raised in June 1956 and broken up at Rostock in 1958.
U-2345	7 Sep 1944	28 Oct 1944	15 Nov 1944	Deutsche Werft, Hamburg	Karl Steffen	Surrendered at Stavanger, Norway. Transferred to Loch Ryan for Operation Deadlight and scuttled on 27 November 1945.
U-2346	14 Sep 1944	31 Oct 1944	20 Nov 1944	Deutsche Werft, Hamburg	Hermann von der Höh	Scuttled in Gelting Bay on 5 May 1945 as part of Operation Regenbogen. Later raised and broken up.
U-2347	19 Sep 1944	6 Nov 1944	2 Dec 1944	Deutsche Werft, Hamburg	Willibald Ulbing	Scuttled in Gelting Bay on 5 May 1945 as part of Operation Regenbogen. Later raised and broken up.
U-2348	22 Sep 1944	11 Nov 1944	4 Dec 1944	Deutsche Werft, Hamburg	Georg Goschzik	Surrendered at Stavanger, Norway. Not selected for Operation Deadlight; broken up at Belfast in April 1949.
U-2349	25 Sep 1944	20 Nov 1944	11 Dec 1944	Deutsche Werft, Hamburg	Hans-Georg Müller	Scuttled in Gelting Bay on 5 May 1945 as part of Operation Regenbogen. Later raised and broken up.
U-2350	28 Sep 1944	22 Nov 1944	23 Dec 1944	Deutsche Werft, Hamburg	Werner Schauer	Surrendered at Kristiansand, Norway. Transferred to Loch Ryan, Scotland for Operation Deadlight and sunk on 28 November 1945.
U-2351	3 Oct 1944	25 Nov 1944	30 Dec 1944	Deutsche Werft, Hamburg	Werner Brückner	Surrendered at Flensburg, Germany. Transferred to Lisahally, Northern Ireland for Operation Deadlight and sank on 3 January 1946.
U-2352	9 Oct 1944	5 Dec 1944	11 Jan 1945	Deutsche Werft, Hamburg	Sigmund Budzyn	Scuttled at Hørup Hav on 5 May 1945 as part of Operation Regenbogen. Later raised and broken up.
U-2353	10 Oct 1944	6 Dec 1944	9 Jan 1945	Deutsche Werft, Hamburg	Jürgen Hillmann	Surrendered at Kristiansand, Norway. Allocated to the USSR by the TNC; arrived at Libau on 4 December 1945 as British submarine N31. Allocated to the Soviet Baltic Fleet on 13 February 1946. Renamed M-51 on 9 June 1949 and became a training hulk in the reserve fleet on 22 December 1950. Struck from the Soviet Navy on 17 March 1952 and broken up in 1963.
U-2354	14 Oct 1944	10 Dec 1944	11 Jan 1945	Deutsche Werft, Hamburg	Hans-Dieter Wex	Surrendered at Kristiansand, Norway. Transferred to Loch Ryan, Scotland for Operation Deadlight and sunk on 22 December 1945.
U-2355	18 Oct 1944	13 Dec 1944	12 Jan 1945	Deutsche Werft, Hamburg	Hans-Heino Franke	Scuttled in the Kieler Förde near Laboe on 3 May 1945 as part of Operation Regenbogen.
U-2356	21 Oct 1944	19 Dec 1944	12 Jan 1945	Deutsche Werft, Hamburg	Friedrich Hartel	Surrendered at Wilhelmshaven, Germany. Transferred to Lisahally, Northern Ireland for Operation Deadlight and sunk on 6 January 1946.
U-2357	21 Oct 1944	20 Dec 1944	13 Jan 1945	Deutsche Werft, Hamburg	Erwin Heinrich	Scuttled at Gelting Bay on 5 May 1945 as part of Operation Regenbogen. Later raised and broken up.
U-2358	1 Nov 1944	22 Dec 1944	16 Jan 1945	Deutsche Werft, Hamburg	Gerhard Breun	Scuttled at Gelting Bay on 5 May 1945 as part of Operation Regenbogen. Later raised and broken up.
U-2359	3 Nov 1944	23 Dec 1944	16 Jan 1945	Deutsche Werft, Hamburg	Gustav Bischoff	Sunk by Allied air attack on a transport mission on 2 May 1945. Found in October 2007 off the island of Læsø in Denmark.
U-2360	7 Nov 1944	29 Dec 1944	23 Jan 1945	Deutsche Werft, Hamburg	Kurt Schrobach	Scuttled in Gelting Bay on 5 May 1945 as part of Operation Regenbogen. Later raised and broken up.
U-2361	12 Nov 1944	3 Jan 1945	3 Feb 1945	Deutsche Werft, Hamburg	Heinz von Henning	Surrendered at Kristiansand, Norway. Transferred to Loch Ryan, Scotland for Operation Deadlight and sunk on 27 November 1945.
U-2362	22 Nov 1944	11 Jan 1945	5 Feb 1945	Deutsche Werft, Hamburg	Martin Czekowski	Scuttled in Gelting Bay on 5 May 1945 as part of Operation Regenbogen. Later raised and broken up.
U-2363	22 Nov 1944	18 Jan 1945	5 Feb 1945	Deutsche Werft, Hamburg	Karl Frahm	Surrendered at Kristiansand, Norway. Transferred to Loch Ryan, Scotland for Operation Deadlight and sunk on 28 November 1945.
U-2364	27 Nov 1944	23 Jan 1945	14 Feb 1945	Deutsche Werft, Hamburg	Dieter Hengen; Gerhard Remus	Scuttled in Gelting Bay on 5 May 1945 as part of Operation Regenbogen. Later raised and broken up.
U-2365	6 Dec 1944	26 Jan 1945	2 Mar 1945	Deutsche Werft, Hamburg	Fritz-Otto Korfmann; Uwe Christiansen	Scuttled in the Kattegat following an air attack on 8 May 1945, later raised and commissioned as Hai in post-war Bundesmarine on 15 August 1957. Sunk in North Sea on 14 September 1966. Raised on 19 September 1966 and broken up.
U-2366	6 Dec 1944	17 Feb 1945	10 Mar 1945	Deutsche Werft, Hamburg	Kurt Jäckel	Scuttled in Gelting Bay on 5 May 1945 as part of Operation Regenbogen. Later raised and broken up.
U-2367	11 Dec 1944	23 Feb 1945	17 Mar 1945	Deutsche Werft, Hamburg	Heinrich Schröder	Sunk after collision with an unidentified German U-boat near Schleimünde on 5 May 1945. Raised in August 1956 and commissioned into the Bundesmarine as Hecht on 1 October 1957. Stricken on 30 September 1968 and broken up at Kiel in 1969.
U-2368	15 Dec 1944	19 Mar 1945	11 Apr 1945	Deutsche Werft, Hamburg	Fritz Ufermann	Scuttled in Gelting Bay on 5 May 1945 as part of Operation Regenbogen. Later raised and broken up.
U-2369	20 Dec 1944	24 Mar 1945	18 Apr 1945	Deutsche Werft, Hamburg	Hermann Schulz; Hans-Walter Pahl	Scuttled in Gelting Bay on 5 May 1945 as part of Operation Regenbogen. Later raised and broken up.
U-2371	19 Jan 1945	18 April 1945	24 Apr 1945	Deutsche Werft, Hamburg	Johannes Kühne	Scuttled in Hamburg-Finkwerder on 3 May 1945 as part of Operation Regenbogen. Later raised and broken up.
U-4701	19 Oct 1944	14 Dec 1944	10 Jan 1945	Germaniawerft, Kiel	Arnold Wiechmann	Scuttled in Hørup Hav off Sønderborg on 5 May 1945 as part of Operation Regenbogen. Later raised and broken up.
U-4702	28 Oct 1944	20 Dec 1944	12 Jan 1945	Germaniawerft, Kiel	Edgar Seeliger	Scuttled in Gelting Bay on 5 May 1945 as part of Operation Regenbogen. Later raised and broken up.
U-4703	1 Nov 1944	3 Jan 1945	21 Jan 1945	Germaniawerft, Kiel	Hans-Ulrich Scholz	Scuttled in Gelting Bay on 5 May 1945 as part of Operation Regenbogen. Later raised and broken up.
U-4704	9 Nov 1944	13 Feb 1945	14 Mar 1945	Germaniawerft, Kiel	Gerhard Franceschi	Scuttled in Hørup Hav off Sønderborg on 5 May 1945 as part of Operation Regenbogen. Later raised and broken up.
U-4705	10 Nov 1944	11 Jan 1945	2 Feb 1945	Germaniawerft, Kiel	Martin Landt-Hayen	Scuttled in Kiel harbour on 3 May 1945 as part of Operation Regenbogen. Later raised and broken up.
U-4706	14 Nov 1944	19 Jan 1945	7 Feb 1945	Germaniawerft, Kiel	Manfred Schneider	Surrendered at Kristiansand. Transferred to the Royal Norwegian Navy in October 1948 and commissioned as HNoMS Knerter. Used for storage by the Royal Norwegian Yacht Club from 14 April 1950. Stricken in 1954 and broken up.
U-4707	5 Dec 1944	25 Jan 1945	20 Feb 1945	Germaniawerft, Kiel	Joachim Leder	Scuttled in Geltinger Bay on 5 May 1945 as part of Operation Regenbogen. Later raised and broken up.
U-4709	1 Dec 1944	8 Feb 1945	3 Mar 1945	Germaniawerft, Kiel	Paul Berkemann	Scuttled in the Germaniawerft dock in Kiel on 4 May 1945 as part of Operation Regenbogen. Later raised and broken up.
U-4710	1 Mar 1945	14 Apr 1945	1 May 1945	Germaniawerft, Kiel	Ludwig-Ferdinand von Friedeburg	Scuttled in Gelting Bay on 5 May 1945 as part of Operation Regenbogen. Later raised and broken up.
U-4711	1 Dec 1944	21 Feb 1945	21 Mar 1945	Germaniawerft, Kiel	Siegfried Endler	Scuttled in the Germaniawerft dock in Kiel on 4 May 1945 as part of Operation Regenbogen. Later raised and broken up.
U-4712	3 Jan 1945	1 Mar 1945	3 Apr 1945	Germaniawerft, Kiel	Karl-Heinz Rohlfing	Scuttled in the Germaniawerft dock in Kiel on 3 May 1945 as part of Operation Regenbogen. Later raised and broken up.
