= Dead Reckoning (1947 film) =

1947 American film noir by John Cromwell

- Theatrical poster
- Directed by: John Cromwell
- Screenplay by: Steve Fisher; Oliver H.P. Garrett
- Story by: Gerald Drayson Adams; Sidney Biddell; Allen Rivkin (adaptation)
- Produced by: Sidney Biddell
- Starring: Humphrey Bogart; Lizabeth Scott; Morris Carnovsky; Charles Cane; William Prince; Marvin Miller; Wallace Ford
- Cinematography: Leo Tover
- Edited by: Gene Havlick
- Music by: Marlin Skiles
- Production company: Columbia Pictures
- Distributed by: Columbia Pictures
- Release dates: December 31, 1946 (San Francisco); January 15, 1947 (U.S.)
- Running time: 100 minutes
- Country: United States
- Language: English

Dead Reckoning is a 1947 American film noir starring Humphrey Bogart and Lizabeth Scott. Directed by John Cromwell, it was written by Steve Fisher and Oliver H. P. Garrett, based on a story by Gerald Drayson Adams and Sidney Biddell, adapted by Allen Rivkin. It follows a war hero, Warren Murdock (Bogart), who begins investigating the death of his best friend and fellow soldier, Johnny Drake (William Prince). The investigation leads Murdock to his friend's lover, a mysterious woman. Drake was accused of murdering her husband.

The film was originally intended to star Rita Hayworth in Scott's role as a followup to Columbia Pictures's successful Gilda (1946), but she refused the role over a contract dispute. Instead, Scott was loaned out from her contract with Paramount Pictures to team with Bogart, who himself was loaned out for the project by Warner Bros. Filming took place in the summer of 1946, largely on Columbia soundstages in Los Angeles, with location shoots occurring in St. Petersburg, Florida; Biloxi, Mississippi; Philadelphia; and New York City.

Dead Reckoning was first released theatrically in San Francisco on New Year's Eve 1946, expanding to a wide theatrical release in January 1947. The film received mixed reviews at the time of its release.

== Plot ==
Father Logan, a well-known ex-paratrooper padre, is approached in a church by Captain "Rip" Murdock. Murdock needs to tell someone what has happened to him in the past few days before his enemies can kill him. A flashback follows:

Just after World War II, paratroopers and close friends Murdock and Sergeant Johnny Drake are mysteriously ordered to travel from Paris to Washington, D.C.. When Drake learns that he is to be awarded the Medal of Honor (and Murdock the Distinguished Service Cross), he flees before newspaper photographers can take his picture. Murdock goes AWOL, follows the clues and tracks his friend to Gulf City in the southern United States, where he learns Drake is dead when his burned corpse is recovered from a car crash.

Murdock finds out that Drake joined the Army under an assumed name to avoid a murder charge. He was accused of killing a rich old man named Chandler because Drake was in love with Chandler's beautiful young wife Coral.

Murdock goes to a nightclub to question bartender Louis Ord, a witness at Drake's trial for Chandler's murder. Ord reveals that Drake had given him a letter to give to Murdock. Murdock also meets Coral and Martinelli, the club owner. Seeing Coral intentionally losing heavily at rigged roulette, Murdock not only recoups her $16,000 losses at craps, he doubles it. When all three go to collect the winnings in Martinelli's private office, Murdock is tipped off by Ord that his drink is drugged. He drinks it anyway to protect Ord, yet awakens in the night to find Ord's body planted in his hotel room. He manages to hide the corpse before police Lieutenant Kincaid, responding to an anonymous tip, shows up to search for it.

Murdock teams up with Coral. Suspecting that Martinelli had Ord killed in order to get Drake's letter, Murdock breaks into Martinelli's office, only to find the safe already open. Just before he is knocked unconscious by an unseen assailant he smells jasmine, the same scent Coral wears. When he awakes Martinelli has him roughed up by his thug Krause, to try to find out the content of the message encoded in the letter. However, Murdock is able to escape from his captors when they run into Kincaid while taking Murdock back to his hotel. The flashback ends, and Murdock slips away.

Now suspicious of Coral, Murdock goes to her apartment to confront her. She claims innocence, but finally admits that she shot Chandler in self-defence, not Drake. She claims she went to Martinelli for advice and gave him the murder weapon to dispose of, but he has been blackmailing her ever since.

Now in love with Coral himself, Murdock agrees to leave town with her, but insists on retrieving the incriminating weapon first, despite Coral's objections. He detonates napalm grenades in Martinelli's office, compelling him to reveal that Coral is his wife, and still was when she married Chandler. He claims he killed Chandler when he learned the man still had a long life ahead of him, then framed Drake so that Coral could inherit Chandler's estate. Martinelli also claims he only ordered Krause to 'shadow' Johnny when he returned home, and that the sadistic Krause was responsible for Johnny's fatal car crash.

Terrified of burning to death, Krause jumps through a window to escape the flames. Murdock obtains the incriminating gun, and marches Martinelli ahead of him en route to police headquarters. As Martinelli opens the door to leave he is shot and killed by Coral.

Murdock jumps into her car and they drive off together. He accuses her of having just tried to kill him, and tells her that she's going to fry in the electric chair. He floors the car, she shoots him, and the car crashes head-on into a tree. Murdock survives, Coral professes her love at the hospital, then expires from her injuries.

== Cast ==
- Humphrey Bogart as Capt. Warren "Rip" Murdock
- Lizabeth Scott as Coral "Dusty"/"Mike" Chandler
- Morris Carnovsky as Martinelli
- Charles Cane as Lt. Kincaid
- William Prince as Sgt. Johnny Drake (John Joseph Preston)
- Marvin Miller as Krause
- Wallace Ford as McGee
- James Bell as Father Logan
- George Chandler as Bartender Louis Ord
- Ruby Dandridge as Maid Mabel

== Production ==
=== Development and casting ===
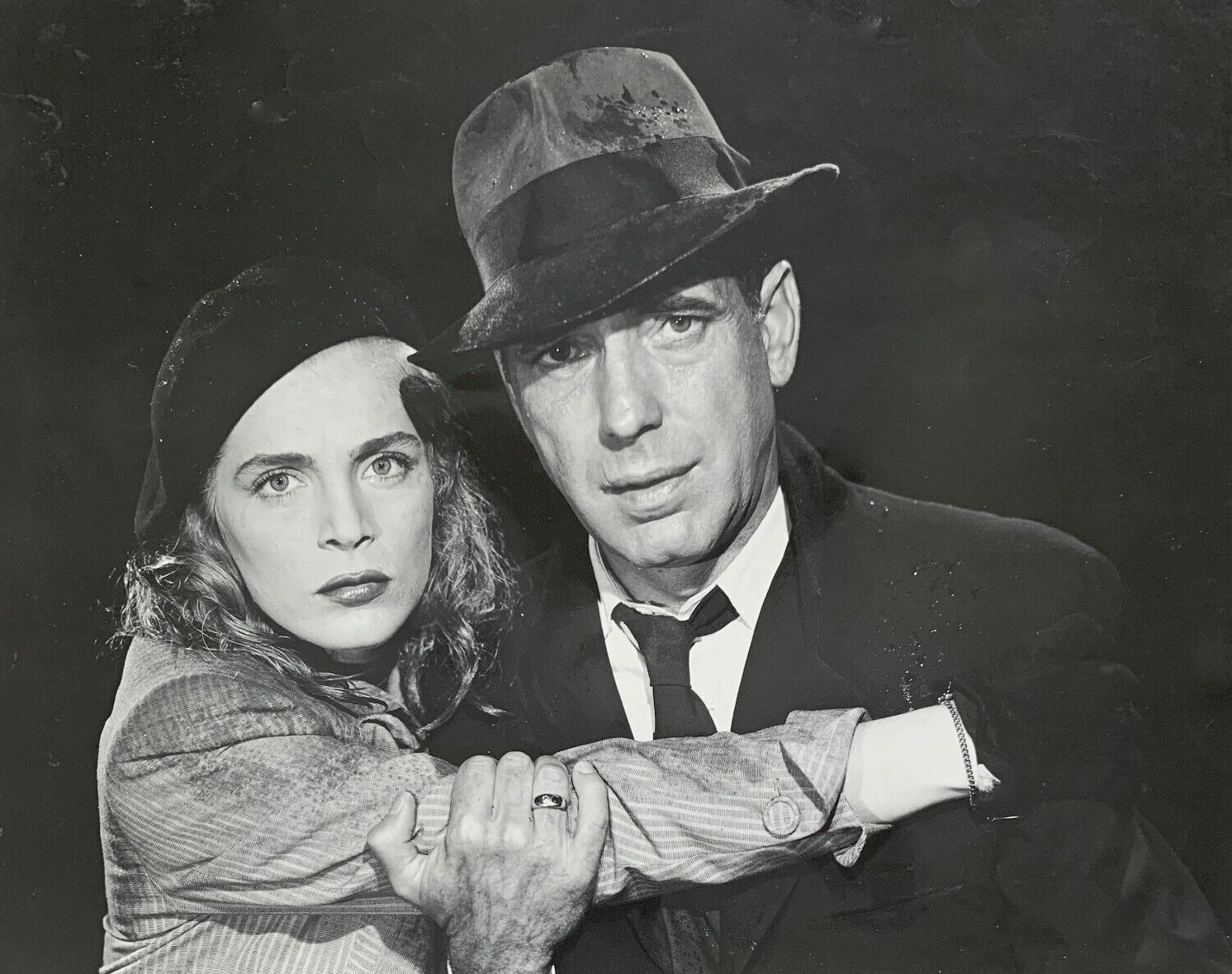
Lizabeth Scott and Humphrey Bogart in Dead Reckoning (1947)

Dead Reckoning was originally intended by Columbia Pictures' production chief Harry Cohn as a vehicle for Rita Hayworth, a follow-up to the extremely popular Gilda. Cohn thought that the pairing of Hayworth and Bogart would be a guaranteed money maker. However, Hayworth was in the middle of a contract dispute with Columbia, and refused to make the film, so she was replaced by Lizabeth Scott, who was borrowed from Paramount Pictures' producer Hal Wallis. Scott, an up-and-coming actress being promoted as "The Threat", was often compared to Bogart's wife, Lauren Bacall, as both were former models, and had deep, sultry voices. In an interview following the production's completion, Bogart commented on working with Scott: "I was warned that she was temperamental, but she couldn't have been nicer to work with." He also refuted the press's comparisons of her to Bacall, instead stating that he felt she more resembled Mayo Methot, his previous wife." When Scott first met Bogart, she gifted him a yachting cap as a nod to his enthusiasm for seafaring and service in the United States Navy.

Bogart was a loan-out from Warner Bros. as well, and was reportedly unhappy with being sent to Columbia at the height of his career, if only because Warner kept any extra money paid by Columbia over and above Bogart's usual salary. Bogart had right of refusal over the director for the film, and picked John Cromwell. Bogart and Cromwell had worked together in 1922 on Broadway in Drifting, a short-lived play by John Colton and D. H. Andrews, when Bogart was a very young actor and Cromwell, the play's director, cast him in his first bit part.

=== Filming ===
Principal photography began on June 10, 1946, and was completed on September 4, 1946, with shoots occurring on the Columbia Pictures soundstages in Los Angeles. Many of Dead Reckoning's exterior shots were filmed on location in St. Petersburg, Florida. Other background and location shooting took place in Philadelphia, Pennsylvania; LaGuardia Airport in New York City; and Biloxi, Mississippi.

Bogart improvised Murdock's extended speech to Scott about men carrying women around in their pockets, taking them out when they were needed to have dinner with or make love to. This idea was one that Bogart was known to espouse when he had been drinking.

=== Music ===
The film's original score was composed by Marlin Skiles. The song "Either It's Love or It Isn't", sung by Lizabeth Scott (dubbed by Trudy Stevens) in the film, had words and music by Allan Roberts and Doris Fisher.

== Release ==
Dead Reckoning had its first screening in San Francisco on December 31, 1946, (Note: While the film had its wide theatrical release in January 1947, it theatrically premiered in San Francisco on December 31, 1946. Some sources, including the British Film Institute and some bibliographic sources support a year of 1946.) before opening in a wide release on January 15, 1947.

Promotional materials for the film highlighted the fact that Bogart was featured opposite a new leading actress (following his numerous appearances in films with his wife Lauren Bacall), with taglines reading: "Bogart is out with a new woman!"

== Reception ==
=== Critical response ===
Dead Reckoning received largely mixed reviews from critics at the time of its release. The New York Times gave the film a mixed review, praising Bogart as "beyond criticism in a role such as Dead Reckoning affords him", with "some of the best all-around dialogue he has had in a long time." However, it was less kind to his co-star, Scott, "whose face is expressionless and whose movements are awkward and deliberate." Although the actions of Bogart's character are not particularly plausible at times, and the plot was considered to be "rambling" with "a lot of things about the script ... that an attentive spectator might find disconcerting," the Times found that "the suspense is skillfully drawn out." The Hollywood Reporter published a review describing the film as "almost too tough for its own good."

Variety magazine also praised Bogart and liked the film, writing, "Humphrey Bogart's typically tense performance raises this average whodunit quite a few notches. Film has good suspense and action, and some smart direction and photography ... Bogart absorbs one's interest from the start as a tough, quick-thinking ex-skyjumper. Lizabeth Scott stumbles occasionally as a nitery singer, but on the whole gives a persuasive sirenish performance."

In 2004, film critic Dennis Schwartz was critical of the film. He wrote, "This second-rate Bogart vehicle has the star depart from his usual tough-guy role, though he manages to get into plenty of the action. It plays as a bleak crime melodrama that is too complexly plotted for its own good ... There's some fun in watching the Bogart character romance the husky-voiced femme fatale character played by Lizabeth Scott, but not enough fun to overcome how unconvincing is the sinister plot."

In 2010 Time Out called Scott "synthetic" but "alluring", and detects a "hint of self-parody" in Bogart's performance. It says that their "relationship never quite convinces, leading to a faintly embarrassing emotional climax." The film, according to the reviewer, "tries too hard to maintain its note of doomed noir romance," but is nevertheless "[h]ighly enjoyable".

Film scholar Robert Miklitsch writes in Siren City: Sound and Source Music in Classic American Noir (2011) that, despite the studio's effort to model Scott after Bacall, "she's not without her charms. Her performance... brings out something Bogart's character that remains occluded in his roles with Bacall, isolating a certain psychic volatility characteristic of the "tough loner," the man who knows too much."

Film scholar Robert Miklitsch suggested in 2011 that Dead Reckoning codified star Lizabeth Scott as "a classic siren à la Kitty Collins in The Killers," as Scott went on to star as a hard-edged femme fatale in a number of films noir following it.

== Analysis ==
Film scholar Steve Cohan writes in Masked Men: Masculinity and the Movies in the Fifties (1997) that a primary theme of Dead Reckoning is the failure of the reintegration of war veterans following their homosocial bonding during the extreme circumstances of combat. He also compares it to Bogart's The Maltese Falcon (1941), writing that it recreates the misogyny of that film through its "rejection of the femme fatale by reimagining it in masculine terms... Dead Reckoning also goes further than that earlier Bogart film in implicating the tough guy's mistrust of women and his corresponding respect for/rivalry with other tough men in a homosexual desire for the phallic virility with which he identifies as the measure of his manhood." Writer Emmett Early echoes a similar sentiment, asserting that the film contains a "disturbed erotic undertone of misogyny," citing several pieces of dialogue spoken by Bogart's character that objectify women.

Cohan also notes that the screenplay combines elements of several of Bogart's previous films, "pushing his tough-guy persona to the point of unintentional self-parody."

== Home media ==
RCA/Columbia Pictures Home Entertainment released the film on LaserDisc on April 25, 1988. Columbia Pictures Home Entertainment released the film on DVD in 2002. In 2022, it was included in a region B Blu-ray box set of Columbia Pictures noir films by the British distributor Indicator Films. Indicator later released a standalone Blu-ray on April 22, 2024.

== Restoration ==
Dead Reckoning underwent a 4K restoration by Sony Pictures in 2022, after which it was screened at the 2023 Wisconsin Film Festival.

== Sources ==
- Blottner, Gene (2015). Columbia Noir: A Complete Filmography, 1940-1962. Jefferson, North Carolina: McFarland. ISBN 978-0-786-47014-3.
- Bodnar, John (2010). The "Good War" in American Memory. Baltimore, Maryland: Johns Hopkins University Press. ISBN 978-1-421-40002-0.
- Cohan, Steve (1997). Masked Men: Masculinity and the Movies in the Fifties. Bloomington, Indiana: Indiana University Press. ISBN 978-0-253-11587-4.
- Early, Emmett (2010). The War Veteran in Film. Jefferson, North Carolina: McFarland. ISBN 978-0-786-48339-6.
- McCarty, Clifford (1965). Bogey - The Films of Humphrey Bogart. New York City, New York: Cadillac Publishing Co., Inc. ISBN 978-0-806-50955-6.
- Miklitsch, Robert (2011). Siren City: Sound and Source Music in Classic American Noir. Rutgers, New Jersey: Rutgers University Press. ISBN 978-0-813-55392-4.
- Quinlan, David (1987). Wicked Women of the Screen. London, England: Batsford. ISBN 978-0-713-45305-8.
- Tuska, Jon (1988). In Manors and Alleys: A Casebook on the American Detective Film. Santa Barbara, California: Greenwood Publishing Group. ISBN 978-0-313-25007-1.
