= Vivadhanajaya =

Thai prince and government official

- Phra Voravongse Ther Phra Ong Chao (Thai: พระวรวงศ์เธอ พระองค์เจ้า)
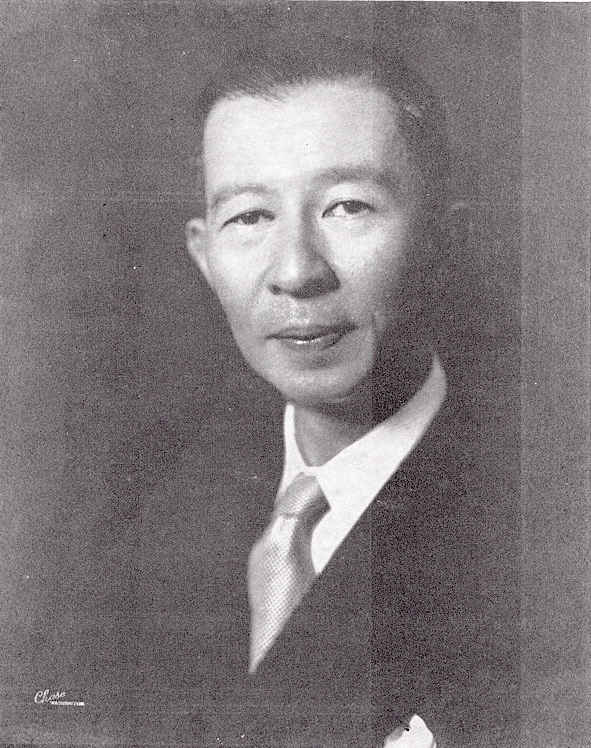
- Prince Vivadhanajaya in 1940
- Born: Vivadhanajaya Jayanta; 29 April 1899; Bangkok, Siam
- Died: 22 August 1960 (aged 61); Bangkok, Thailand
- Spouse: M. R. Chaovarit Snidvongs; Princess Patkanana Kitiyakara
- Issue: 3
- Thai: วิวัฒนไชย
- House: Jayanta family (Chakri dynasty)
- Father: Jayanta Mongkol, the Prince Mahisara Rajaharudaya
- Mother: Mom Suan Jayanta na Ayudhaya

Vivadhanajaya (Thai: พระองค์เจ้าวิวัฒนไชย; RTGS: Wiwatthanachai; 29 April 1899 – 22 August 1960) was a Thai prince and government official. He was a grandson of King Mongkut (Rama IV). He served his country as the first governor of the Bank of Thailand, later as Minister of Finance and as the first chairman of the board of the Crown Property Bureau.

== Early life and education ==
Prince Vivadhanajaya was born Mom Chao Vivadhanajaya Jayanta, the son of Prince Jayanta Mongkol, the Prince Mahisara Rajaharudaya, and Mom Suan Jayanta na Ayudhaya. Both of his parents died when he was still young. He attended the Royal Pages College when he was 6 years old, and finished Grade 6 at the age of 12 years old in 1911. After the death of King Chulalongkorn (Rama V), Queen Saovabha Phongsri sponsored him for study in England. He began his elementary education at Torquay Preparatory School and was there for 2 years. In 1913 he entered Cheltenham College to continue his secondary education. In 1916 he began his studies at Magdalen College, University of Cambridge and received a second class honours degree in history (B.A.) in 1919. Afterwards he continued his studies in Paris at the École Libre des Sciences Politiques for 1 more year. In 1920 he completed his education and returned to Siam permanently.

== Government service ==
When he returned to Siam he entered the service of King Vajiravudh (Rama VI), to serve in the Ministry of the Treasury (named later changed to Ministry of Finance) as Secretary to the Minister. In 1927 King Prajadhipok (Rama VII), in recognition of his ability, appointed him the Permanent Secretary to the Ministry of the Treasury. He was only 28 years old at the time, making him the youngest Permanent Secretary in the government.

In addition to his government role he was also appointed to the West Coast Seaboard Council, which was established to maintain and improve the economic conditions of the country's western sea board. Around this time he was also appointed to the king's Privy Council.

In 1930 Vivadhanajaya was appointed Director-General of the Revenue Department. Radical changes and reforms were implement by the prince. Such as the complete reorganisation and modernisation of the tax code. For the first time taxes were to be directly collected by the government as opposed to the old tax farms that were once used.

The prince was highly regarded for his ability and competency. Even after the revolution of 1932, when all the members of the extended royal family were removed from government, the prince was able to remain in his post. In 1932 he was given the additional post of Director-General of the Excise Department, giving up this role in 1933. The prince remained as director-general of the Revenue Department until 1935.

In 1942 the Bank of Thailand was founded by the Bank of Thailand Act, which was promulgated on 28 April 1942. Prince Vivadhanajaya was appointed its first governor and began his position on 27 November 1942. The prince held this position for a full term of 5 years, ending in 1946. During this time he steered the Thai Baht through the turmoils of World War II.

== Post-war service ==
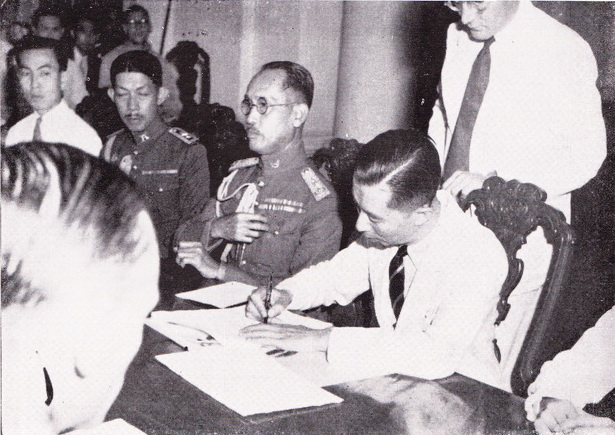
Prince Vivadhanajaya signing the Anglo-Thai Peace Treaty in 1946

After the surrender of Thailand to the Allied powers in 1945. Prince Vivadhanajaya was appointed head of the Thai delegation to negotiate the ending of the status of war with the United Kingdom. On 21 September 1945 he arrived in Kandy, Sri Lanka to begin negotiations. Later the negotiations were moved to Singapore and were concluded in December of the same year. As a result, the Anglo-Thai Peace Treaty was signed on 1 January 1946. With Vivadhanajaya signing on behalf of the Thai government. Afterwards he also negotiated and signed the separate Australian–Thai Peace Treaty on 3 April 1946.

On 11 November 1947 the prince was appointed the Minister of Finance in the government of Prime Minister Khuang Aphaiwong, however when Field Marshal Plaek Phibunsongkhram replaced Khuang as prime minister on 8 April 1948, he removed the prince as finance minister. Instead on 3 September 1948 the prince was appointed governor of the Bank of Thailand, his second term in that office. However, after only 90 days he was once again returned to the position of finance minister on 30 November 1948. He served his this capacity until being replaced as minister of finance by the field marshal himself on 13 October 1949. After this, the prince retired from the government after almost 30 years of continuous service.

On 8 May 1950 Vivadhanajaya was elevated by King Bhumibol Adulyadej (Rama IX) to a higher princely rank of Phra Ong Chao in his coronation honours. Thus becoming Phra Worawong There Phra Ong Chao Vivadhanajaya. On 8 April 1952 the prince was appointed to the newly formed privy council of King Bhumibol. Ever since his tenure as minister of finance the prince was asked to join the board of the committee overseeing crown property in 1948. Despite his retirement from the government the continued to sit on this board and was instrumental in the reforming of the Crown Property Bureau and the changing of its status as a government agency into an independent juristic body. He became its first chairman.

== Family ==
Prince Vivadhanajaya was married twice. Both of his wives were of princely rank and are descended from Chakri kings. He was first married to Mom Rajawongse Chaovarit Snidvongs in 1921, they had two children together, she died in 1929. Her grandfather was Prince Wongsa Dhiraj Snid. Afterwards he married Mom Chao Patkanana Kitiyakara, a daughter of Prince Kitiyakara Voralaksana, the Prince of Chantaburi, and they had one child together. His second wife was the half-sister of Prince Nakkhatra Mangala, father of Queen Sirikit.

== Death ==
Prince Vivadhanajaya had heart disease later in his life. On 22 August 1960 while writing a letter his heart stopped. He died at the age of 61 years, 3 months and 24 days. King Bhumibol received the news of his death at the Queluz Palace, Lisbon, during a state visit to Portugal. The king assigned his mother, Princess Srinagarindra (who was regent at the time) to preside over the funeral ceremony.
