= Anglo-Thai Peace Treaty =

1946 treaty between the United Kingdom and Thailand

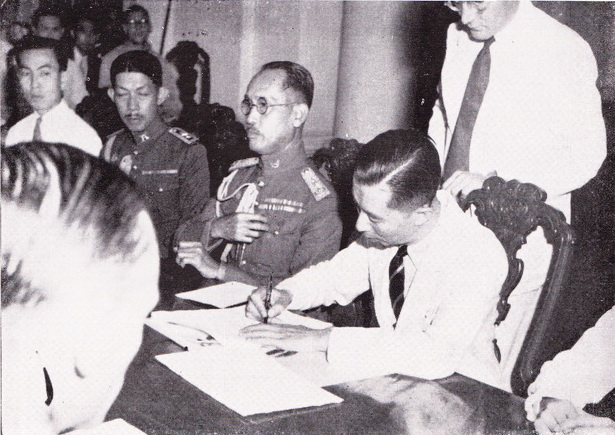
Prince Vivadhanajaya Jayanta signing the Anglo-Thai Peace Treaty in 1946

The Anglo-Thai Peace Treaty (long title: Formal Agreement for the Termination of the State of War between Siam and Great Britain and India) signed in Singapore on 1 January 1946 ended the state of war that had existed between Thailand and the United Kingdom since the former's declaration of war of 25 January 1942 during World War II. Although the Thais had also declared war on the United States on the same day, a U.S.–Thai peace treaty was never signed because the American government opted not to recognise the legality of the declaration in light of the Japanese invasion of Thailand on 8 December 1941.

The peace treaty went into effect on the day it was signed. It was registered in the United Nations Treaty Series on 23 August 1951.

== Background ==
During World War II, Thailand was an ally of the Empire of Japan. In that capacity, it gained some territories that were incorporated in Thailand in exchange for freedom for the Japanese government to establish military bases in these territories as well as in the rest of Thailand. The territories gained by Thailand were taken from French Indochina during a brief war with France in late 1940 and early 1941 and from British Malaya during the Japanese attack in December 1941. On 25 January 1942, the Thai government declared war on the United States and the United Kingdom. The Northern Army was sent to assist in the invasion of British Burma and part of that area was annexed.

During the war, parts of the Thai government kept secret ties with the Allied governments and cooperated secretly with their intelligence services. As the Japanese government surrendered in August 1945, the Thai government claimed it was never at war with the western powers, and that the declaration of war was imposed on it by the Japanese government. The US government accepted this legal interpretation, and treated the Thai government as a friendly nation. The British government, however, refused to accept this interpretation and demanded that a peace treaty be concluded.

== Effects of the treaty ==
The main effect of the peace treaty was to undo the Thai annexation of the Shan States and four of the Unfederated Malay States. The British achieved less than they had hoped, largely because the United States opposed any punitive action against Thailand. They were unable, for instance, to reduce the size of Thai armed forces. The treaty did require the free delivery of up to 1.5 million tons rice, which was in surplus in Thailand, to British Malaya, where there was a shortage. It also forbade the Thais from building a canal across the Kra isthmus without British government permission, which clause undercut the authority of Pridi Banomyong's government.

After its enactment, the United States and Britain restored diplomatic relations with Thailand on 5 January. The next day a general election was held. After the treaty, the United States lent $10,000,000 to Thailand for the reconstruction of her transportation network, heavily damaged by American bombing. Thailand joined the United Nations on 16 December 1946.

A separate Australian–Thai Peace Treaty, required by the Australian declaration of war of 2 March 1942 and the Australian Statute of Westminster Adoption Act, was signed on 3 April 1946.

== Sources ==
- Battersby, Paul (2000). "An Uneasy Peace: Britain, the United States and Australia's Pursuit of War Reparations from Thailand, 1945–1952". Australian Journal of International Affairs. 54 (1): 15–31. doi:10.1080/00049910050007014. S2CID 153688878.
- Darling, Frank C. (1962). "American Policy in Thailand". The Western Political Quarterly. 15 (1): 93–110. doi:10.1177/106591296201500107. S2CID 154874038.
- Fine, Herbert A. (1965). "The Liquidation of World War II in Thailand". Pacific Historical Review. 34 (1): 65–82. doi:10.2307/3636740. JSTOR 3636740.
- Peterson, Alec (1946). "Britain and Siam: The Latest Phase". Pacific Affairs. 19 (4): 364–72. doi:10.2307/2752453. JSTOR 2752453.
- Reynolds, E. Bruce (2005). Thailand's Secret War: OSS, SOE and the Free Thai Underground During World War II. Cambridge University Press.
- Tarling, Nicholas (1978). "Rice and Reconciliation: The Anglo-Thai Peace Negotiations of 1945" (PDF). Journal of the Siam Society. 66 (2): 59–112.
- Tarling, Nicholas (1979). "Atonement before Absolution: British Policy Towards Thailand during World War II" (PDF). Proceedings of the Seventh IAHA Conference. 2. Bangkok: 1433–49.
