= Australian–Thai Peace Treaty =

1946 treaty between Australia and Thailand

- Type: Peace treaty
- Signed: 3 April 1946
- Location: Bangkok, Thailand
- Condition: Ratification by Australia and Thailand
- Signatories: Australia; Thailand

The Australian–Thai Peace Treaty that ended World War II between Australia and Thailand was signed in Bangkok on 3 April 1946. The full title of the peace treaty is "Final Peace Agreement Between the Government of Australia and the Government of Siam". It was one of the first expressions of Australian sovereignty and independence in foreign affairs after the Statute of Westminster came into effect in 1942.

== Background ==
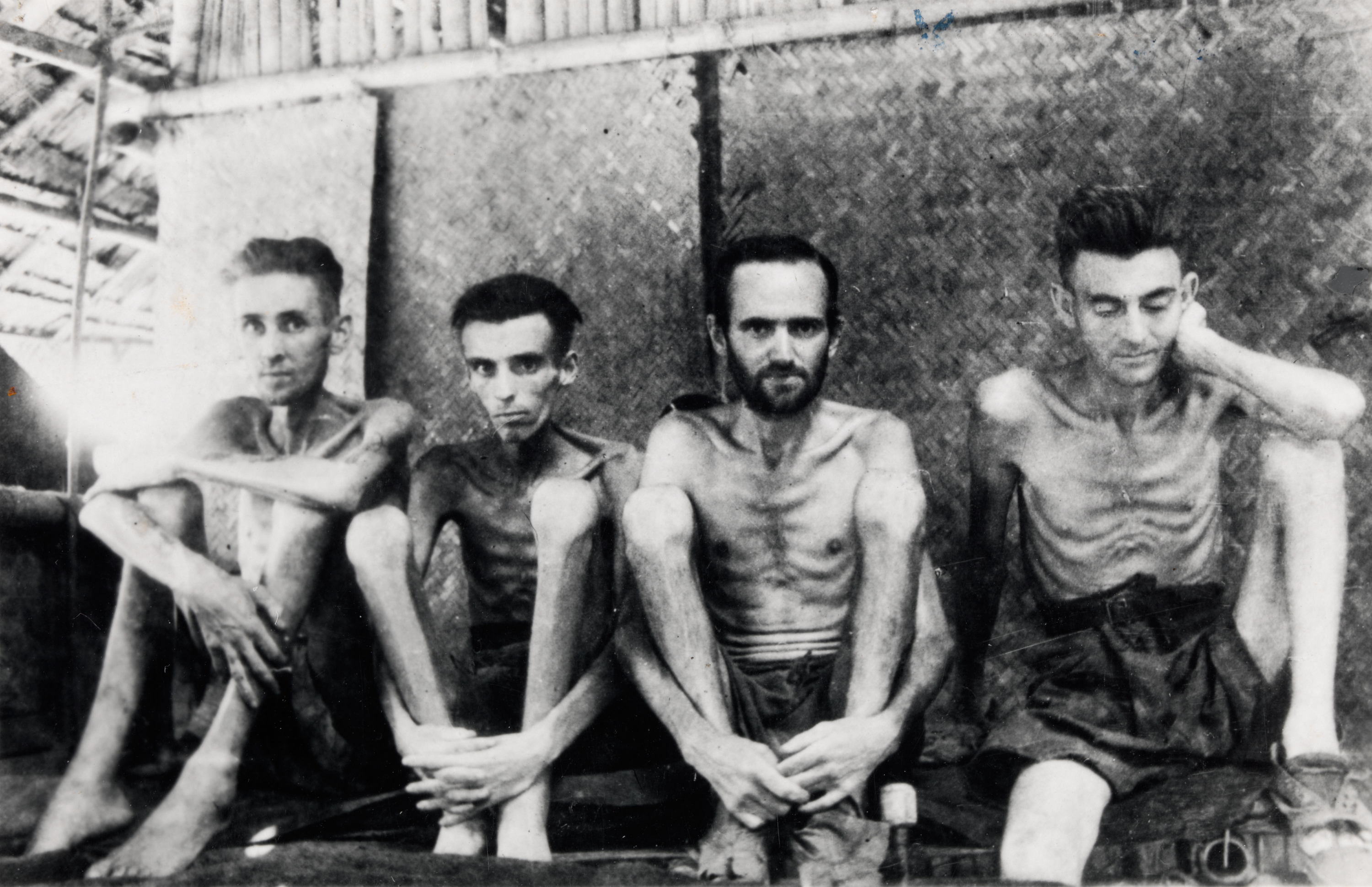
Australian and Dutch prisoners of war at Tarsau in Thailand, 1943

In November 1941, as concerns about war with the Japanese in the Pacific grew, the Thai minister of justice, Thawan Thamrongnawasawat, met the Australian prime minister, Robert Gordon Menzies, in Canberra during a goodwill tour of the British Empire in Asia. This meeting was designed to assure the government of Australia of Thailand's neutrality. The British had been pressing the Australians to establish a legation in Bangkok, but the latter still preferred that their interests be represented by Westminster. On 8 December, the Japanese invaded Thailand and the Thais quickly accepted Japanese terms for the transit of their armies. On 21 December, Thailand signed a broad military alliance with Japan. The Allied bombing of Thailand had already begun when, on 25 January 1942, the Thai government declared war on Britain and the United States. While the latter refused to accept the action as a free one and did not regard Thailand as other than an occupied country, Britain responded in kind. Since Australia then had no representation in Bangkok, Canberra asked the Swiss to inform the Thai government on 2 March that it had declared war on Thailand. There was no response, and the Thais claimed after the war that they had no intention of going to war with Australia and were unaware of the convention that Australia was at war whenever Britain was. There were only eleven Thai persons in Australia at the time, and all were watched by the Security Service of the Commonwealth Investigations Branch. Some Australians, mostly employees of the tin mines, were interned along with the British in Thailand.

== Negotiations ==
In October 1945, the Chifley government sent Lieutenant-Colonel Allan J. Eastman of the Australian Army as their representative in Allied-occupied Bangkok. J. C. R. Proud, the Australian political representative in Singapore, summed up the government's position with regards to peace with Thailand when he advised Eastman that "the death in Siam of so many Australian prisoners of war is a fact which cannot be disregarded by us." The British suggested that Australia should negotiate its own peace treaty with Thailand, and it was briefly considered elevating Eastman to the post of minister to Thailand, but it was decided not to establish full diplomatic relations with a state with which Australia was still at war. Eastman was appointed consul and participated in Anglo-Thai negotiations taking place at Singapore even before royal assent to his consulship was obtained. Since Thailand had never formally recognised a state of war with Australia, it regarded a separate treaty with the latter as a technicality. Australia's terms were simply that Thailand end its state of war with Britain and accept Britain's peace terms. It insisted on the trial of collaborators with the Japanese—which the Thais resented—and on reparations in relation to the tin mines. The Thais did try and imprison former Prime Minister Plaek Phibunsongkhram in order to forestall any Allied tribunal before signing the Anglo-Thai Peace Treaty on 1 January 1946.

After the British peace treaty, Eastman exchanged notes with the Thai negotiator, Prince Vivadhanajaya Jayanta, confirming that a separate treaty with Australia would be signed no later than 3 April. The government in Canberra considered withdrawing him from Bangkok at that point, but he urged his retention so long as the process for determining compensation claims lasted. He was not withdrawn until ratifications of the peace treaty were exchanged in May. In 1950 Thailand agreed to pay £6 million in compensation to the governments of Britain and Australia for wartime damage to their tin mining operations. The Australian share amounted to just over £1 million.

== Sources ==
- Thīrawit, Khīan [Khien Theeravit] (1979). Australian–Thai Relations: A Thai Perspective. Occasional Paper No. 58. Singapore: Institute of Southeast Asian Studies. OCLC 22409046.
- Battersby, Paul (2000). "An Uneasy Peace: Britain, the United States and Australia's Pursuit of War Reparations from Thailand, 1945–1952". Australian Journal of International Affairs. 54 (1): 15–31. doi:10.1080/00049910050007014. ISSN 1035-7718. S2CID 153688878.
