= German submarine U-792 =

German World War II submarine

History

Nazi Germany
- Name: U-792
- Ordered: 19 June 1942
- Builder: Blohm & Voss, Hamburg
- Yard number: 455
- Laid down: 1 December 1942
- Launched: 28 September 1943
- Commissioned: 16 November 1943
- Fate: Scuttled on 4 May 1945

General characteristics
- Class & type: Type XVIIA submarine
- Displacement: 277 t (273 long tons) surfaced; 309 t (304 long tons) submerged; 373 t (367 long tons) total
- Length: 39.05 m (128 ft 1 in) o/a; 26.15 m (85 ft 10 in) pressure hull
- Beam: 4.50 m (14 ft 9 in) o/a; 3.30 m (10 ft 10 in) pressure hull
- Draught: 4.30 m (14 ft 1 in)
- Propulsion: 1 × Deutz SAA SM517 supercharged 8-cylinder diesel engine, 210 PS (210 shp; 150 kW); 1 × AEG Maschine AWT98 electric motor, 77 PS (76 shp; 57 kW); 2 × Walter gas turbines, 5,000 PS (4,900 shp; 3,700 kW); 1 shaft
- Speed: 9 knots (17 km/h; 10 mph) surfaced; 5 knots (9.3 km/h; 5.8 mph) submerged (electric drive); 25 knots (46 km/h; 29 mph) submerged (HTP drive)
- Range: 2,910 nmi (5,390 km; 3,350 mi) at 8.5 knots (15.7 km/h; 9.8 mph) surfaced; 50 nmi (93 km; 58 mi) at 2 knots (3.7 km/h; 2.3 mph) submerged (electric drive); 127 nmi (235 km; 146 mi) at 20 knots (37 km/h; 23 mph) submerged (HTP drive)
- Complement: 12
- Armament: 2 × 53.3 cm (21 in) torpedo tubes (bow); 4 × torpedoes

Service record
- Part of: 5th U-boat Flotilla; 16 – 30 November 1943; 8th U-boat Flotilla; 1 December 1943 – 15 February 1945; 5th U-boat Flotilla; 16 February – 4 May 1945
- Identification codes: M 52 456
- Commanders: Lt.z.S. / Oblt.z.S. Horst Heitz; 16 November 1943 – December 1944; Oblt.z.S. Hans Diederich Duis; December 1944 – 4 May 1945
- Operations: None
- Victories: None

German submarine U-792 was a Type XVIIA U-boat of Nazi Germany's Kriegsmarine during the Second World War. She was one of a small number of U-boats fitted with Hellmuth Walter's high test peroxide propulsion system, which offered a combination of air-independent propulsion and high submerged speeds. She spent the war as a trials vessel and was scuttled on 4 May 1945 in the Audorfer See, near Rendsburg.

== Construction ==
The U-792 was laid down on 1 December 1942 at the Blohm & Voss shipyard in Hamburg, Germany. She was launched on 28 September 1943 and commissioned on 16 November 1943 under the command of Oberleutnant zur See Horst Heitz.

When she was completed, the submarine was 39.05 metres (128 ft 1 in) long overall, with a beam of 4.50 metres (14 ft 9 in) and a draught of 4.30 metres (14 ft 1 in). She was assessed at 309 t (304 long tons) submerged. The submarine was powered by one Deutz SAA SM517 supercharged 8-cylinder four-stroke diesel engine producing a total of 210 metric horsepower (150 kW; 210 shp) for use while surfaced and two Walter gas turbines producing a total of 5,000 metric horsepower (3,700 kW; 4,900 shp) for use while submerged. She had one shaft and one 1.23 m (4 ft) propeller. The submarine had a maximum surface speed of 9 knots (17 km/h; 10 mph) and a maximum submerged speed of 25 knots (46 km/h; 29 mph) when submerged, the U-boat could operate for 127 nautical miles (235 km; 146 mi) at 20 knots (37 km/h; 23 mph) and when surfaced, she could travel 1.840 nautical miles (3.408 km; 2.117 mi) at 9 knots (17 km/h; 10 mph).

The submarine was fitted with two 53.3 cm (21 in) torpedo tubes (All fitted at the bow) and four torpedoes. The boat had a complement of 12 men.

== Service History And End ==
U-792 did not undertake any combat patrols and was instead assigned as a trials boat at first to the 5th U-boat Flotilla, followed by the 8th U-boat Flotilla, before returning to the 5th flotilla for the rest of the war and was used in March 1945 as a floating fuel bunker. In December 1944, her commander was replaced by Oberleutnant zur See Hans Diederich Duis.

The U-792 was scuttled on 4 May 1945 at 01:30 in the Audorfer See (Kaiser Wilhelm Canal), near Rendsburg during Operation Regenbogen.

== Wreck ==
The wreck of U-792 lay at 54°19′N 09°43′E until 26 May 1945, when she was lifted by the British and taken to the Howaldtswerke in Kiel to be examined. She was first raised as a British prize and used for trials, but was soon torn down for parts and finally scrapped.

== Bibliography ==
- Busch, Rainer; Röll, Hans-Joachim (1999). German U-boat commanders of World War II : a biographical dictionary. Translated by Brooks, Geoffrey. London, Annapolis, Md: Greenhill Books, Naval Institute Press. ISBN 1-55750-186-6.
- Busch, Rainer; Röll, Hans-Joachim (1999). Der U-Boot-Krieg, 1939-1945: Deutsche U-Boot-Verluste von September 1939 bis Mai 1945 [German U-boat losses from September 1939 to May 1945] (in German). Vol. IV. Hamburg, Berlin, Bonn: Mittler. ISBN 3-8132-0514-2.
- Gröner, Eric; Jung, Dieter; Maass, Martin (1991). German Warships 1815-1945: U-boats and Mine Warfare Vessels. Vol. 2. Translated by Thomas, Keith; Magowan, Rachel. London: Conway Maritime Press. ISBN 0-85177-593-4.
