= HMS Meteorite =

German experimental U-boat

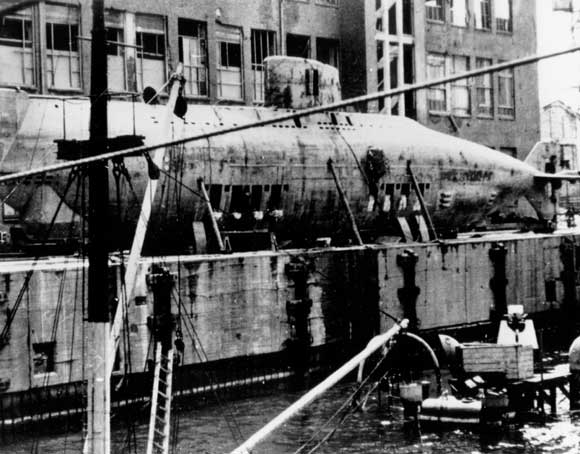
- The U-1406, a vessel of the same class as HMS Meteorite / U-1407

History

Nazi Germany
- Name: U-1407
- Ordered: 4 January 1943
- Builder: Blohm & Voss, Hamburg
- Yard number: 257
- Laid down: 13 November 1943
- Launched: February 1945
- Commissioned: 13 March 1945
- Fate: Surrendered on 5 May 1945 at Cuxhaven; Scuttled on 7 May 1945; Raised, seized and rebuilt by United Kingdom in 1945

United Kingdom
- Name: HMS Meteorite
- Acquired: 1945
- Commissioned: 25 September 1945
- Decommissioned: September 1949
- Fate: Broken up

General characteristics
- Class & type: Type XVIIB submarine
- Displacement: 312 long tons (317 t) surfaced; 337 long tons (342 t) submerged; 415 long tons (422 t) total
- Length: 41.45 m (136 ft 0 in) o/a; 27.30 m (89 ft 7 in) pressure hull
- Beam: 4.5 m (14 ft 9 in) o/a; 3.3 m (10 ft 10 in) pressure hull
- Draught: 4.5 m (14 ft 9 in)
- Propulsion: 1 × Deutz SAA SM517 supercharged 8-cylinder diesel engine, 210 PS (210 shp; 150 kW); 1 × AEG Maschine AWT98 electric motor, 77 PS (76 shp; 57 kW); 1 × Walter gas turbine, 2,500 PS (2,500 shp; 1,800 kW); 1 shaft
- Speed: 8.5 knots (15.7 km/h; 9.8 mph) surfaced; 4.5 knots (8.3 km/h; 5.2 mph) submerged (electric drive); 20 knots (37 km/h; 23 mph) submerged (HTP drive)
- Range: 2,970 nmi (5,500 km; 3,420 mi) at 8.5 knots (15.7 km/h; 9.8 mph) surfaced; 40 nmi (74 km; 46 mi) at 4.5 knots (8.3 km/h; 5.2 mph) submerged (electric drive); 114 nmi (211 km; 131 mi) at 20 knots (37 km/h; 23 mph) submerged (HTP drive)
- Complement: 12
- Armament: 2 × 53.3 cm (21 in) torpedo tubes (bow); 4 × torpedoes

Service record (Kriegsmarine)
- Part of: 5th U-boat Flotilla; 13 March – 5 May 1945
- Identification codes: M 47 655
- Commanders: Oblt.z.S. Horst Heitz; 29 March – 5 May 1945
- Operations: None
- Victories: None

HMS Meteorite was an experimental U-boat developed in Germany, scuttled at the end of World War II, subsequently raised and commissioned into the Royal Navy. The submarine was originally commissioned into the Kriegsmarine on 13 March 1945 as U-1407. She was built around a Walter engine fueled by high-test peroxide (HTP), the fuel known as T-Stoff in German service.

== History ==
The three completed German Type XVIIB submarines were scuttled by their crews at the end of the Second World War, U-1405 at Flensburg and U-1406 and U-1407 at Cuxhaven, all in what became the British Zone of Occupation in Germany. U-1406 and U-1407 were scuttled on 7 May 1945 by Oberleutnant zur See Gerhard Grumpelt even though a superior officer, Kapitän zur See Kurt Thoma, had prohibited such actions. Grumpelt was subsequently sentenced to seven years' imprisonment by a British military court for his actions.

At the Potsdam Conference in July 1945 U-1406 was allocated to the United States and U-1407 to the United Kingdom, and both were soon salvaged.

== Royal Navy service ==
U-1407 was salvaged in June 1945, and transported to Barrow-in-Furness, where she was refitted by Vickers with a new and complete set of machinery also captured in Germany, under the supervision of Professor Hellmuth Walter. Because she was intended to be used solely for trials and possibly as a high-speed anti-submarine target, her torpedo tubes were removed. She was commissioned into the Royal Navy on 25 September 1945 and renamed HMS Meteorite.

The Royal Navy was attracted by the air-independent propulsion potential of U-1407. The boat arrived secretly at Vickers Yard in Barrow-in-Furness under tow in poor internal condition. It received pennant number N.25 on 25 September 1945 and was commissioned as HMS Meteorite on 26 August 1947. The submarine underwent a lengthy refit with a new Mk 17B HTP turbine engine under the supervision of Professor Helmut Walter and a team of German engineers transferred to Barrow (initially Walter and seven engineers on 1 January 1946, later expanding to 14 men with families). The refit involved a complete overhaul, new components from Germany, a new escape system, revised ventilation, replacement of all electrical equipment, and removal of the torpedo tubes. The boat was intended for experimental use, with possible later employment as a high-speed anti-submarine target if trials proved successful.

During 1946 Meteorite carried out a series of trials under the guidance of Walter and his original team from Germaniawerft, Kiel. The trials raised considerable interest in the possibility of HTP as an alternative to nuclear power as air-independent propulsion and the Admiralty placed an order for two larger experimental Walter boats based on the German Type XXVI, the Explorer-class submarines HMS Explorer and HMS Excalibur, to be followed by an operational class of 12 boats.

Sea trials began in 1948. HMS Meteorite left Barrow at the end of January for preliminary First of Class trials off the west coast of Scotland using only diesel-electric propulsion. These trials familiarised the crew with handling and control responses and tested surface and submerged speeds, turning circles, diving, and depth-changing performance between 10 and 13 March 1948. On-shore combustion trials of the HTP turbine ran from July to September 1947, with final shore tests completed in July 1948 before the turbine was fitted aboard. Surface trials with the Walter engine continued until October 1948 (delayed by rough weather). These achieved speeds over 14 knots and demonstrated reliable turbine operation. A Royal Navy report noted the enormous operational potential of high-speed HTP submarines for evasion, while highlighting disadvantages such as the high cost and scarcity of HTP, the need for escort and storage vessels, difficulties in surface handling in rough seas, lack of astern power, and high noise levels.

It is considered that a small and fast submarine, even with the very high manoeuvrability of HMS Meteorite at 14 knots, would be a very hard target for an A/S ship to sink. It would have been extremely interesting to have been able to observe the manoeuvrability of HMS Meteorite if she had been refitted with the two [HTP] turbines as designed, thereby giving her a designed speed of 25 knots.

Testing of the submarine occurred between 17 March and 30 April 1949, with the first week dedicated to fueling and towing. While the submarine's operation on the surface was challenging, her underwater performance was described as "easy to handle", and the crew became more comfortable with her behaviour.

Considerable confidence in the operation, as well as control and ease of handling the plant, was gained. The only engineering troubles experienced were of a general nature, and were not directly connected with the turbine unit itself.

The expense of HTP, which costs at least £300 per ton and is in short supply. The need for a fulltime escort vessel for accommodation. The need for a storage ship for the HTP The length of time taken to transit from harbour to any exercise area. On the surface, and in anything but the calmest of seas, the casing was almost continuously under water. Meteorite’s “grave” lack of astern power. Hence, she is unable to stop quickly in an emergency should one arise. None of the machinery was mounted on rubber, and the submarine was very noisy, thus facilitating detection by surface ships.

== Fate ==
Meteorite's Royal Navy service came to an end in September 1949, and she was broken up by Thos. W. Ward of Barrow-in-Furness.

== Bibliography ==
- Busch, Rainer; Röll, Hans-Joachim (1999). German U-boat Commanders of World War II: A Biographical Dictionary. Translated by Brooks, Geoffrey. London, Annapolis, Md: Greenhill Books, Naval Institute Press. ISBN 1-55750-186-6.
- Busch, Rainer; Röll, Hans-Joachim (1999). Der U-Boot-Krieg [The U-boat War, Vol. 4: German U-boat Losses from September 1939 to May 1945] (in German). Vol. IV: Deutsche U-Boot-Verluste von September 1939 bis Mai 1945. Hamburg, Berlin, Bonn: Mittler. ISBN 3-8132-0514-2.
- Gröner, Erich; Jung, Dieter; Maass, Martin (1991). German Warships 1815–1945. Vol. 2: U-boats and Mine Warfare Vessels. Translated by Thomas, Keith; Magowan, Rachel. London: Conway Maritime Press. ISBN 0-85177-593-4.
