= German submarine U-793 =

German World War II submarine

History

Nazi Germany
- Name: U-793
- Ordered: 19 June 1942
- Builder: Blohm & Voss, Hamburg
- Yard number: 456
- Laid down: 1 December 1942
- Launched: 4 March 1944
- Commissioned: 24 April 1944
- Fate: Scuttled on 4 May 1945

General characteristics
- Class & type: Type XVIIA submarine
- Displacement: 277 long tons (281 t) surfaced; 309 long tons (314 t) submerged; 373 long tons (379 t) total
- Length: 39.05 m (128 ft 1 in) o/a; 26.15 m (85 ft 10 in) pressure hull
- Beam: 4.5 m (14 ft 9 in) o/a; 3.3 m (10 ft 10 in) ph
- Draught: 4.3 m (14 ft 1 in)
- Installed power: 210–230 hp (210–230 shp; 160–170 kW) (surfaced drive); 77.5 PS (76.4 shp; 57.0 kW) (submerged electric drive); 2,500 hp (2,500 shp; 1,900 kW) (submerged HTP drive)
- Propulsion: 1 × Deutz SAA 8M517 supercharged 8-cylinder diesel engine (surface drive); 1 × AEG Maschine AWT98 electric motor (submerged drive); 1 × Walter gas turbines HTP drive (submerged HTP drive); 1 shaft
- Speed: 9 knots (17 km/h; 10 mph) (surfaced); 5 knots (9.3 km/h; 5.8 mph) (submerged electric drive); 25 knots (46 km/h; 29 mph) (submerged HTP drive)
- Range: 2,910 nmi (5,390 km; 3,350 mi) at 8.5 knots (15.7 km/h; 9.8 mph) (surfaced); 50 nmi (93 km; 58 mi) at 2 knots (3.7 km/h; 2.3 mph) (submerged)(electric drive); 127 nmi (235 km; 146 mi) at 20 knots (37 km/h; 23 mph) (submerged HTP drive)
- Capacity: 18 t (40,000 lb) (fuel oil); 43 t (95,000 lb) (H_{2}O_{2})
- Complement: 12
- Armament: 2 × 53.3 cm (21 in) torpedo tubes (bow); 4 × torpedoes

Service record
- Part of: 8th U-boat Flotilla; 24 April 1944 – 15 February 1945; 5th U-boat Flotilla; 16 February – 4 May 1945
- Identification codes: M 52 805
- Commanders: Oblt.z.S. Günther Schauenburg; 24 April 1944 – 15 January 1945; Oblt.z.S. Friedrich Schmidt; 16 January – 3 May 1945
- Operations: None
- Victories: None

German submarine U-793 was a Type XVIIA U-boat of Nazi Germany's Kriegsmarine during the Second World War. She was one of a small number of U-boats fitted with Hellmuth Walter's high test peroxide propulsion system, which offered a combination of air-independent propulsion and high submerged speeds. She spent the war as a trials vessel and was scuttled on 4 May 1945 in the Audorfer See, near Rendsburg.

== Construction ==
The U-793 was laid down on 1 December 1942 at the Blohm & Voss, Hamburg, as yard number 456. She was launched on 4 March 1944 and commissioned under the command of Oberleutnant zur See Günther Schauenburg on 24 April 1944.

When she was completed, the submarine was 39.05 metres (128 ft 1 in) long overall, with a beam of 4.50 metres (14 ft 9 in) and a draught of 4.30 metres (14 ft 1 in). She was assessed at 309 long tons (314 t) submerged. The submarine was powered by one Deutz SAA 8M517 supercharged 8-cylinder diesel engine producing a total of 210–230 metric horsepower (150–170 kW; 210–230 shp) for use while surfaced and one Walter gas turbines producing a total of 2,500 metric horsepower (1,800 kW; 2,500 shp) for use while submerged. She had one shaft and one propeller. The submarine had a maximum surface speed of 9 knots (17 km/h; 10 mph) and a maximum submerged speed of 25 knots (46 km/h; 29 mph) using the HTP drive. When submerged, the U-boat could operate for 127 nautical miles (235 km; 146 mi) at 20 knots (37 km/h; 23 mph) on her HTP system and when surfaced, she could travel 2,910 nautical miles (5,390 km; 3,350 mi) at 8.5 knots (15.7 km/h; 9.8 mph).

The submarine was fitted with two 53.3 cm (21 in) torpedo tubes (All fitted at the bow) and four torpedoes. The boat had a complement of 12 men.

== Service history ==
U-793 did not undertake any war patrols and was instead assigned as a trials boat at first to the 8th U-boat Flotilla, followed by the 5th U-boat Flotilla.

The U-793 was scuttled on 4 May 1945 at 1.30am in the Audorfer See (Kaiser Wilhelm Canal), near Rendsburg during Operation Regenbogen.

=== Wreck ===
The wreck of U-793 lay at 54°19′N 09°43′E until 26 May 1945, when she was lifted by the British and taken to the Howaldtswerke in Kiel to be examined. She was first raised as a British prize and used for trials, but was soon torn down for parts and finally scrapped.

== Bibliography ==
- Busch, Rainer; Röll, Hans-Joachim (1999). German U-boat commanders of World War II : a biographical dictionary. Translated by Brooks, Geoffrey. London, Annapolis, Md: Greenhill Books, Naval Institute Press. ISBN 1-55750-186-6.
- Busch, Rainer; Röll, Hans-Joachim (1999). Der U-Boot-Krieg, 1939-1945: Deutsche U-Boot-Verluste von September 1939 bis Mai 1945 [German U-boat losses from September 1939 to May 1945] (in German). Vol. IV. Hamburg, Berlin, Bonn: Mittler. ISBN 3-8132-0514-2.
- Gröner, Eric; Jung, Dieter; Maass, Martin (1991). German Warships 1815-1945: U-boats and Mine Warfare Vessels. Vol. 2. Translated by Thomas, Keith; Magowan, Rachel. London: Conway Maritime Press. ISBN 0-85177-593-4.
