= 3030 (disambiguation) =

3030 may refer to:

- A.D. 3030, a year in the 4th millennium CE
- 3030 BC, a year in the 4th millennium BCE
- 3030, a number in the 3000 (number) range

== Other uses ==
- .30-30 ammunition
- Winchester drive IBM model 3030 computer equipment
- German submarine U-3030, a World War II German U-boat
- Texas Farm to Market Road 3030
- 3030 Vehrenberg, an asteroid in the Asteroid Belt, the 3030th asteroid registered

== See also ==
- 30-30 (disambiguation)
- 30 (disambiguation)
