= German submarine U-794 =

German World War II submarine

Coordinates: 54°48′N 09°49′E

History

Nazi Germany
- Name: U-794
- Ordered: 7 August 1942
- Builder: Germaniawerft, Kiel
- Yard number: 718
- Laid down: 1 February 1943
- Launched: 7 October 1943
- Commissioned: 14 November 1943
- Fate: Scuttled on 5 May 1945, later broken up

General characteristics
- Class & type: Type XVIIA submarine
- Displacement: 236 long tons (240 t) surfaced; 259 long tons (263 t) submerged; 312 long tons (317 t) total
- Length: 36.60 m (120 ft 1 in) o/a
- Beam: 4.5 m (14 ft 9 in) o/a; 3.4 m (11 ft 2 in) pressure hull
- Draught: 4.55 m (14 ft 11 in)
- Propulsion: 1 × Deutz SAA SM517 supercharged 8-cylinder diesel engine, 210 PS (210 shp; 150 kW); 1 × AEG Maschine AWT98 electric motor, 77 PS (76 shp; 57 kW); 2 × Walter gas turbines, 5,000 PS (4,900 shp; 3,700 kW); 1 shaft
- Speed: 9 knots (17 km/h; 10 mph) surfaced; 5 knots (9.3 km/h; 5.8 mph) submerged (electric drive); 25 knots (46 km/h; 29 mph) submerged (HTP drive)
- Range: 1,840 nmi (3,410 km; 2,120 mi) at 9 knots (17 km/h; 10 mph) surfaced; 76 nmi (141 km; 87 mi) at 2 knots (3.7 km/h; 2.3 mph) submerged (electric drive); 117 nmi (217 km; 135 mi) at 20 knots (37 km/h; 23 mph) submerged (HTP drive)
- Complement: 12
- Armament: 2 × 53.3 cm (21 in) torpedo tubes (bow); 4 × torpedoes

Service record
- Part of: 5th U-boat Flotilla; 14 – 30 November 1943; 8th U-boat Flotilla; 1 December 1943 – 14 February 1945; 5th U-boat Flotilla; 15 February – 5 May 1945
- Identification codes: M 52 496
- Commanders: Oblt.z.S. Werner Klug; 14 November 1943 – 31 August 1944; Oblt.z.S. Philipp Becker; 1 September 1944 – 5 May 1945
- Operations: None
- Victories: None

German submarine U-794 was a Type XVIIA U-boat of Nazi Germany's Kriegsmarine during the Second World War. She was one of a small number of U-boats fitted with Hellmuth Walter's high test peroxide propulsion system, which offered a combination of air-independent propulsion and high submerged speeds. She spent the war as a trials vessel and was scuttled on 5 May 1945 in Gelting Bay.

U-794 was built by Friedrich Krupp Germaniawerft, Kiel. The keel was laid down on 1 February 1943, and the boat was launched on 7 October. She was commissioned on 14 November. The Feldpost Number was M 52 496.

U-794 did not undertake any combat patrols and was instead assigned as a trials boat at first to the 5th U-boat Flotilla, followed by the 8th U-boat Flotilla, before returning to the 5th flotilla for the rest of the war. In late March 1944, Admiral Karl Dönitz and four other admirals took part in a trial of U-794. Although they were enthusiastic, the boat, designed for high underwater speed (over 20 m.p.h.) was difficult to manoeuvre, and the keel to beam ratio was too high.

== Bibliography ==
- Busch, Rainer; Röll, Hans-Joachim (1999). German U-boat commanders of World War II : a biographical dictionary. Translated by Brooks, Geoffrey. London, Annapolis, Md: Greenhill Books, Naval Institute Press. ISBN 1-55750-186-6.
- Busch, Rainer; Röll, Hans-Joachim (1999). Der U-Boot-Krieg, 1939-1945: Deutsche U-Boot-Verluste von September 1939 bis Mai 1945 [German U-boat losses from September 1939 to May 1945] (in German). Vol. IV. Hamburg, Berlin, Bonn: Mittler. ISBN 3-8132-0514-2.
- Gröner, Eric; Jung, Dieter; Maass, Martin (1991). German Warships 1815-1945: U-boats and Mine Warfare Vessels. Vol. 2. Translated by Thomas, Keith; Magowan, Rachel. London: Conway Maritime Press. ISBN 0-85177-593-4.
- "U-Boat Operations of the Second World War: Vol. 2: Career histories, U511-UIT25" by Kenneth Wynn, Naval Institute Press, Annapolis, 1998.
