= The Thirty =

The Thirty may refer to:

- David's Mighty Warriors, the retinue of the Biblical king David
- Thirty Tyrants, the Athenian oligarchy beginning in 404 BC
- Trial of the thirty, trial of anarchists in the Third French Republic
- The Thirty (Drenai Series), series of books by David Gemmell
- Thirty, a novel by Howard Vincent O'Brien recently made available on Project Gutenberg
- Thirty (album), a 2013 album by Australian recording artist Anthony Callea

== See also ==
- 30 (disambiguation)
