= German submarine U-795 =

German World War II submarine

History

Nazi Germany
- Name: U-795
- Ordered: 7 August 1942
- Builder: Germaniawerft, Kiel
- Yard number: 719
- Laid down: 2 February 1943
- Launched: 21 March 1944
- Commissioned: 22 April 1944
- Decommissioned: 22 February 1945
- Fate: Scuttled on 3 May 1945, later broken up

General characteristics
- Class & type: Type XVIIA submarine
- Displacement: 236 long tons (240 t) surfaced; 259 long tons (263 t) submerged; 312 long tons (317 t) total
- Length: 36.60 m (120 ft 1 in) o/a
- Beam: 4.5 m (14 ft 9 in) o/a; 3.4 m (11 ft 2 in) pressure hull
- Draught: 4.55 m (14 ft 11 in)
- Propulsion: 1 × Deutz SAA SM517 supercharged 8-cylinder diesel engine, 210 PS (210 shp; 150 kW); 1 × AEG Maschine AWT98 electric motor, 77 PS (76 shp; 57 kW); 2 × Walter gas turbines, 5,000 PS (4,900 shp; 3,700 kW); 1 shaft
- Speed: 9 knots (17 km/h; 10 mph) surfaced; 5 knots (9.3 km/h; 5.8 mph) submerged (electric drive); 25 knots (46 km/h; 29 mph) submerged (HTP drive)
- Range: 1,840 nmi (3,410 km; 2,120 mi) at 9 knots (17 km/h; 10 mph) surfaced; 76 nmi (141 km; 87 mi) at 2 knots (3.7 km/h; 2.3 mph) submerged (electric drive); 117 nmi (217 km; 135 mi) at 20 knots (37 km/h; 23 mph) submerged (HTP drive)
- Complement: 12
- Armament: 2 × 53.3 cm (21 in) torpedo tubes (bow); 4 × torpedoes

Service record
- Part of: 8th U-boat Flotilla; 22 April 1944 – 15 February 1945; 5th U-boat Flotilla; 16 February – 3 May 1945
- Identification codes: M 53 834
- Commanders: Oblt.z.S. Horst Selle; 22 April 1944 – 3 May 1945
- Operations: None
- Victories: None

German submarine U-795 was a Type XVIIA U-boat of Nazi Germany's Kriegsmarine during World War II.

U-795 was laid down on 2 February 1943 at the Friedrich Krupp Germaniawerft shipyard at Kiel. Commissioned on 21 March 1944, the U-boat was commissioned on 22 April 1944 under the command of Oberleutnant zur See Horst Selle. She served with 8th U-boat Flotilla until 15 February as a training boat, and then with 5th U-boat Flotilla until 3 May 1945.

On 3 May 1945, while in dry dock at Kiel, the engine room was destroyed with explosives to prevent its usefulness to the enemy if captured.

== Bibliography ==
- Busch, Rainer; Röll, Hans-Joachim (1999). German U-boat commanders of World War II : a biographical dictionary. Translated by Brooks, Geoffrey. London, Annapolis, Md: Greenhill Books, Naval Institute Press. ISBN 1-55750-186-6.
- Busch, Rainer; Röll, Hans-Joachim (1999). Der U-Boot-Krieg, 1939-1945: Deutsche U-Boot-Verluste von September 1939 bis Mai 1945 [German U-boat losses from September 1939 to May 1945] (in German). Vol. IV. Hamburg, Berlin, Bonn: Mittler. ISBN 3-8132-0514-2.
- Gröner, Eric; Jung, Dieter; Maass, Martin (1991). German Warships 1815-1945: U-boats and Mine Warfare Vessels. Vol. 2. Translated by Thomas, Keith; Magowan, Rachel. London: Conway Maritime Press. ISBN 0-85177-593-4.
