= Howard O'Brien =

Howard O'Brien may refer to:

- Howard Allen Frances O'Brien, birthname of Anne Rice, American author
- Howard Vincent O'Brien, American novelist and journalist
