= Dr. Weis =

Dr. Weis may refer to the following:

- Judith Weis, a doctor known as Dr. Weis
- Dr. Weis, a fictional Jewish theologian in the novel Thirty (Novel) by Howard Vincent O'Brien.
