= 30-30 =

30-30 or variation, may refer to:

- 30–30 club, a term in baseball
- .30-30 Winchester, a rifle round
- ¡30-30!, Mexican artists' group, named after the rifle
- Thirty Thirty, a main character on BraveStarr television series
- Santana 30/30, a sailboat
- The Twin City-Twin 30, the first round of Adam Svensson in the PGA Tour’s 2025 3M Open. Alongside caddie Jace Walker, Adam shot pairs of 30 (30-30) on each nine. This included 9 birdies and an eagle on the par 5 18th hole.

== See also ==
- 30 by 30 world initiative
- 30 for 30, ESPN TV series
- 3030 (disambiguation)
- 30 (disambiguation)
