= German submarine U-1406 =

German World War II submarine

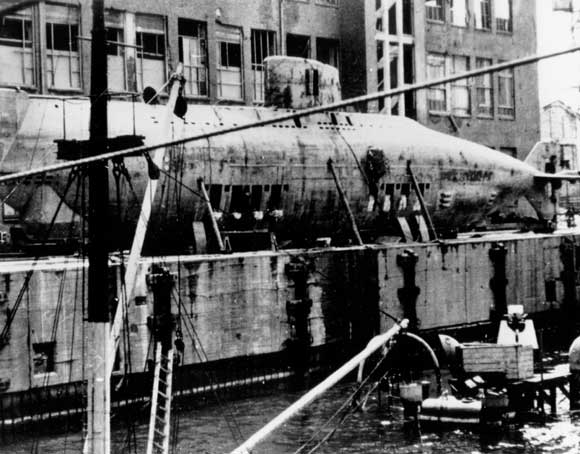
- U-1406

History

Nazi Germany
- Name: U-1406
- Ordered: 4 January 1943
- Builder: Blohm & Voss, Hamburg
- Yard number: 256
- Laid down: 30 October 1943
- Launched: 2 January 1945
- Commissioned: 8 February 1945
- Fate: Surrendered on 5 May 1945 at Cuxhaven; Scuttled on 7 May 1945; Raised and broken up after 18 May 1948

General characteristics
- Class & type: Type XVIIB submarine
- Displacement: 312 t (307 long tons) (surfaced); 337 t (332 long tons) (submerged); 415 t (408 long tons) (total)
- Length: 41.45 m (136 ft) o/a; 27.30 m (89 ft 7 in) pressure hull
- Beam: 4.50 m (14 ft 9 in) o/a; 3.30 m (10 ft 10 in) pressure hull
- Draught: 4.30 m (14 ft 1 in)
- Installed power: 210 PS (210 shp; 150 kW) (surface diesel drive); 77 PS (76 shp; 57 kW) (submerged electric drive); 2,500 PS (2,500 shp; 1,800 kW) (submerged HTP drive)
- Propulsion: 1 × Deutz SAA 8M517 supercharged 8-cylinder diesel engine (surface diesel drive); 1 × AEG Maschine AWT98 electric motor (submerged electric drive); 1 × Walter gas turbines HTP (submerged HTP drive); 1 shaft
- Speed: 8.8 knots (16.3 km/h; 10.1 mph) (surface diesel drive); 5 knots (9.3 km/h; 5.8 mph) (submerged electric drive); 25 knots (46 km/h; 29 mph) (submerged HTP drive)
- Range: 3,000 nmi (5,600 km; 3,500 mi) at 8 knots (15 km/h; 9.2 mph) (surface diesel drive); 76 nmi (141 km; 87 mi) at 2 knots (3.7 km/h; 2.3 mph) (submerged electric drive); 123 nmi (228 km; 142 mi) at 25 knots (46 km/h; 29 mph) (submerged HTP drive)
- Test depth: 150 m (490 ft)
- Capacity: 20.2 t (45,000 lb) (fuel oil); 52 t (115,000 lb) (H_{2}O_{2})
- Complement: 19
- Armament: 2 × 53.3 cm (21 in) torpedo tubes (bow); 4 × torpedoes

Service record
- Part of: 8th U-boat Flotilla; 8 – 15 February 1945; 5th U-boat Flotilla; 16 February – 5 May 1945
- Identification codes: M 47 655
- Commanders: Oblt.z.S. Werner Klug; 8 February – 5 May 1945
- Operations: None
- Victories: None

German submarine U-1406 was a Type XVIIB U-boat of Nazi Germany's Kriegsmarine during the Second World War. She was one of a small number of U-boats fitted with Hellmuth Walter's high test peroxide propulsion system, which offered a combination of air-independent propulsion and high submerged speeds.

U-1406 was laid down on 30 October 1943 at the Blohm & Voss, Hamburg, as yard number 256. She was launched on 2 January 1945 and commissioned under the command of Oberleutnant zur See Werner Klug on 8 February 1945.

== Design ==
When completed, U-1406 was 41.45 metres (136 ft) long overall, with a beam of 4.50 metres (14 ft 9 in) and a draught of 4.3 metres (14 ft 1 in). She was assessed at 337 long tons (342 t) submerged. The submarine was powered by one Deutz SAA 8M517 supercharged 8-cylinder diesel engine producing a total of 210–230 metric horsepower (150–170 kW; 210–230 shp) for use while surfaced and one Walter gas turbine producing a total of 2,500 metric horsepower (1,800 kW; 2,500 shp) for use while submerged. She had one shaft and one propeller. The submarine had a maximum surface speed of 8.5 knots (15.7 km/h; 9.8 mph) and a maximum submerged speed of 25 knots (46 km/h; 29 mph) using the HTP drive. When submerged, the U-boat could operate for 123 nautical miles (228 km; 142 mi) at 25 knots (46 km/h; 29 mph) on her HTP system and when surfaced, she could travel 3,000 nautical miles (5,600 km; 3,500 mi) at 8 knots (15 km/h; 9.2 mph).

The submarine was fitted with two 53.3 cm (21 in) torpedo tubes (All fitted at the bow) and four torpedoes. The boat had a complement of 19 men.

== Service history ==
U-1406 did not undertake any war patrols and was instead assigned as a training boat at first to the 8th U-boat Flotilla, followed by the 5th U-boat Flotilla.

The U-1406 was scuttled on 7 May 1945 in Cuxhaven. The wreck was later raised and broken up.

== Bibliography ==
- Busch, Rainer; Röll, Hans-Joachim (1999). German U-boat commanders of World War II : a biographical dictionary. Translated by Brooks, Geoffrey. London, Annapolis, Md: Greenhill Books, Naval Institute Press. ISBN 1-55750-186-6.
- Busch, Rainer; Röll, Hans-Joachim (1999). Deutsche U-Boot-Verluste von September 1939 bis Mai 1945 [German U-boat losses from September 1939 to May 1945]. Der U-Boot-Krieg (in German). Vol. IV. Hamburg, Berlin, Bonn: Mittler. ISBN 3-8132-0514-2.
- Gröner, Erich; Jung, Dieter; Maass, Martin (1991). U-boats and Mine Warfare Vessels. German Warships 1815–1945. Vol. 2. Translated by Thomas, Keith; Magowan, Rachel. London: Conway Maritime Press. ISBN 0-85177-593-4.
