= German submarine V-80 =

German World War II experimental submarine

- Prototype German V-80 midget submarine at sea

History

Nazi Germany
- Name: V-80
- Builder: Germaniawerft, Kiel
- Yard number: 597
- Launched: 19 January 1940
- Commissioned: Never commissioned
- Fate: Scuttled on 29 March 1945

General characteristics
- Type: experimental submarine
- Displacement: 76 t (75 long tons)
- Length: 22.05 m (72 ft 4 in)
- Beam: 2.1 m (6 ft 11 in)
- Draught: 3.2 m (10 ft 6 in)
- Propulsion: Walter turbine, 2,000 PS (2,000 shp; 1,500 kW)
- Speed: 28.1 knots (52.0 km/h; 32.3 mph)
- Range: 50 nmi (93 km; 58 mi)
- Complement: 4 men
- Armament: None

The V-80 (German: Versuchs-U-Boot V 80) was a experimental submarine. The prototype was completed in 1940 in Friedrich Krupp Germaniawerft in Kiel. The vessel was designed to test the Walter hydrogen peroxide-based turbine propulsion system.

The only earlier attempt to use a chemical reaction based air-independent propulsion system was in the Spanish submarine the Ictineo II.

This midget submarine led to the design of the German Type XVII submarine.

== Background ==
A World War I and World WarII-era submarine relied on diesel engines for surface cruising, and on battery-powered electric engines for underwater travel. Submerged speed and range were limited by the battery capacity. For example, the standard ocean-going U-boat Type VII had a surface range of 8,700 nmi (16,100 km; 10,000 mi) at cruising speed of 10 kn (19 km/h; 12 mph), but only a submerged range of 90 nmi (170 km; 100 mi) at a cruising speed of 4 kn (7.4 km/h; 4.6 mph). A top speed of 8 kn (15 km/h; 9.2 mph) could only be maintained for one hour. Because of these limitations, a submarine was in fact rather a surface vessel with the capability to dive for tactical reasons. Once a submarine was detected and submerged, its chances to execute a successful attack were quite low.

In 1933 Hellmuth Walter, a German engineer working at Germaniawerft sought to overcome these limitations, and started to experiment with hydrogen peroxide powered engines for high-speed underwater propulsion. Walter suggested a 300 ton submarine with two diesel engines which would take their oxygen needed to burn fuel from the decomposed hydrogen peroxide. As the submarine would operate primarily submerged at speeds between 25 and 30 knots, it did not have an outer casing but a smooth fish-like hull without protrusions. At the end of 1933 Walter received permission to design a 300-400 ton Type V U-boat, which would not only use its diesel engines fed by air on the surface and by hydrogen peroxide submerged, but it would also use a turbine powered by steam generated by the decomposing hydrogen peroxide. This Type V was designed to have a top submerged speed of 24 knots, a submerged range of 500 miles at 15 knots and a surfced range of 2000 miles at 15 knots. The design was proposed to the Kriegsmarine on 15 March 1934, and as a results on 10 April further research into the Walter turbine was authorized.

== Design ==
In 1939 Walter received a contract to build the experimental submarine V-80 which in the autumn of 1940 could achieve an underwater speed of 28.1 knots (52.0 km/h; 32.3 mph) with an air-independent propulsion system consisting of a hydrogen peroxide powered steam turbine. A diesel-electric powered submarine spent most of its time on the surface cruising on diesel engines and its outer hull was that of a classic surface ship, but as the Walter turbine provided high underwater speeds, a more streamlined outer hull was needed for submerged cruising. The V-80 had a fish-like hull with a smooth exterior.

== Characteristics ==
The V-80 had an overall length of 22.05 m (72 ft 4 in), a beam of 2.10 m (6 ft 11 in) and a draft of 3.20 m (10 ft 6 in). The displacement on the surface was 73 t (72 long tons), and submerged 76 t (70 long tons).

The boat was powered by a Walter turbine, giving 2,000 brake horsepower (1,500 kW), which gave a maximum speed of 17 knots (31 km/h; 20 mph). With a fuel capacity of 20 t (20 long tons), the submerged range was 50 nmi (93 km; 58 mi) at 26 knots (48 km/h; 30 mph). Maximum submerged speed was 28.1 knots (52.0 km/h; 32.3 mph). The complement consisted of four men.

== Service ==
The V-80 was launched on 19 January 1940 and entered service on 19 April the same year. On 20 April 1940 V-80 put to sea for the first time. The crew of V-80 consisted of maximum four men, all civilians, with usually Walter himself in command. The first trial were conducted in the estuary of the Schlei where she was based in a covered dock. The shallow waters of the estuary limited the underwater speed to 14 knots, but in the autumn of 1940 her base was moved to Hela in the Gulf of Danzig where she achieved an underwater speed of 28.1 knots. Around 100 voyages were executed with the V-80.

On 14 November 1941 the V-80 was demonstrated before admiral Erich Raeder, the head of the Kriegsmarine, and admiral Werner Fuchs, the head of the Kriegsmarine's Construction Office.

She was scuttled on 29 March 1945 off Hela.

== Gallery ==
V-80 midget submarine during sea trials, World War II

V-80 schematic

== See also ==
- History of submarines
- List of U-boat types

== Bibliography ==
- Blair, Clay (1998). Hitler's U-Boat War: The Hunted 1942–1945. Vol. 2. Cassell. ISBN 978-0-304-35261-6.
- Breyer, Siegfried (1996). Wunderwaffe Elektro-Uboot Typ. XXI [Miracle Weapons: Electro submarine Typ. XXI]. Marine-Arsenal Sonderhaft Band 13 (in German). Wölfersheim-Berstadt: Podzun-Pallas Verlag. ISBN 978-3-7909-0587-8.
- Miller, David (2000). U-boats : history, development and equipment 1914-1945. London: Conway Maritime Press. ISBN 9780851777900.
- Möller, Eberhard; Brack, Werner (2004). The Encyclopedia of U-Boats: from 1904 to the present. London: Chatham. ISBN 978-1-85367-623-9.
- Rössler, Eberhard (2001) [1981]. The U-boat: The Evolution and Technical History of German Submarines. London: Cassell. ISBN 0-304-36120-8.
