= Type XVII submarine =

Class of German U-boat

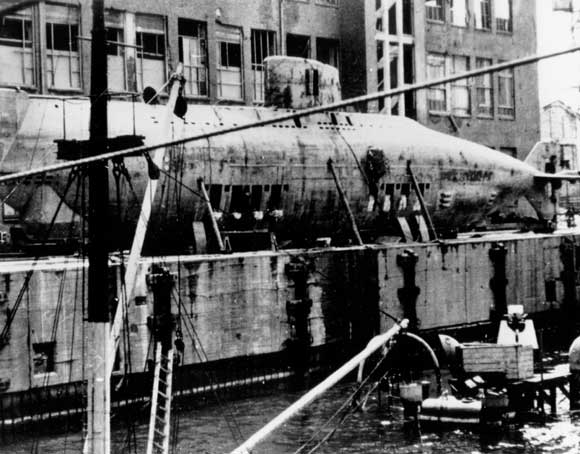
- Type XVIIB submarine U-1406, partially dismantled shortly after the end of World War II

Class overview
- Builders: Blohm + Voss, Hamburg; Friedrich Krupp Germaniawerft, Kiel
- Operators: Kriegsmarine; United States Navy; Royal Navy
- Preceded by: Type II (Conventional coastal submarine); V-80 (AIP testbed)
- Succeeded by: Type XXIII (conventional coastal submarine)
- Built: 1942 – 1945
- In commission: 1943 – 1949
- Planned: 16
- Completed: 7
- Canceled: 9

General characteristics Type XVIIB
- Type: Coastal submarine
- Displacement: 312 t (307 long tons) surfaced; 337 t (332 long tons) submerged
- Length: 41.45 m (136 ft 0 in) o/a; 27.30 m (89 ft 7 in) pressure hull
- Beam: 4.50 m (14 ft 9 in) o/a; 3.30 m (10 ft 10 in) pressure hull
- Draft: 4.50 m (14 ft 9 in)
- Propulsion: 1 × Deutz SAA SM517 supercharged 8-cylinder Diesel engine, 210 PS (210 shp; 150 kW); 1 × AEG Maschine AWT98 electric motor, 77 PS (76 shp; 57 kW); 1 shaft; Wa 201 U-792 & Wk 202 : 2 × Walter gas turbines, 5,000 PS (4,900 shp; 3,700 kW); Wa 201 U-793 & Type XVIIB : 1 × Walter gas turbine, 2,500 PS (2,500 shp; 1,800 kW)
- Speed: 8.5 knots (15.7 km/h; 9.8 mph) surfaced; 4.5 knots (8.3 km/h; 5.2 mph) submerged (electric drive); 20 knots (37 km/h; 23 mph) submerged (HTP drive)
- Range: 2,970 nmi (5,500 km; 3,420 mi) at 8.5 knots (15.7 km/h; 9.8 mph) surfaced; 40 nmi (74 km; 46 mi) at 4.5 knots (8.3 km/h; 5.2 mph) submerged (electric drive); 114 nmi (211 km; 131 mi) at 20 knots (37 km/h; 23 mph) submerged (HTP drive) or 169 nmi (313 km; 194 mi) at 15 knots (28 km/h; 17 mph) submerged (HTP drive)
- Complement: 12
- Armament: 2 × 53.3 cm (21 in) torpedo tubes (bow); 2 × reserve torpedoes stored on the torpedo room floor.

The Type XVII U-boats were small coastal submarines that used a high-test peroxide propulsion system, which offered a combination of air-independent propulsion and high submerged speeds.

== Background ==
In the early 1930s Hellmuth Walter had designed a small, high-speed submarine with a streamlined form propelled by high-test peroxide (HTP) and in 1939 he was awarded a contract to build an experimental vessel, the 80 ton V-80, which achieved an underwater speed of 28.1 knots (52.0 km/h; 32.3 mph) during trials in 1940. On 14 November 1941 Admirals Erich Raeder and Werner Fuchs (head of the Kriegsmarine's Construction Office) witnessed a demonstration of the V-80; Raeder was impressed, but Fuchs was slow to approve further tests.

Following the success of the V-80's trials, Walter contacted Karl Dönitz in January 1942, who enthusiastically embraced the idea and requested that these submarines be developed as quickly as possible. An initial order was placed in summer 1942 for four development submarines.

== Construction ==
Of these, U-792 and U-793, designated Wa 201, were built by Blohm + Voss, achieved 20.25 kn (37.50 km/h; 23.30 mph) submerged. The other pair, U-794 and U-795, designated Wk 202, were constructed by Friedrich Krupp Germaniawerft, Kiel.

The U-793 achieved a submerged speed of 22 kn (41 km/h; 25 mph) in March 1944 with Admiral Dönitz aboard. In June 1944 U-792 achieved 25 kn (46 km/h; 29 mph) over a measured mile.

The submarines were found to be very hard to handle at high speed, and were plagued by numerous mechanical problems, low efficiency, and the fact that a significant amount of power was lost due to increased back pressure on the exhaust at depth. Also, the length to beam ratio was too low, resulting in an unnecessarily high drag.

Admiral Fuchs argued that introducing a new type of U-boat would hinder current production efforts, but Dönitz argued the case for them and on 4 January 1943 the Kriegsmarine ordered 24 Type XVII submarines.

Construction of operational Type XVII submarines – the Type XVIIB – was begun at the Blohm + Voss yard in Hamburg. The Type XVIIB, unlike the Wa 201 and Wk 202, had only a single turbine. The initial order was for 12 submarines, U-1405 through U-1416. However, Blohm + Voss were already struggling to cope with orders for Type XXI submarines and the Kriegsmarine reduced the order to six.

== Projected types ==
Twelve Type XVIIG of slightly improved design, U-1081 through U-1092, were at the same time ordered from Germaniawerft.

A projected Type XVIIK would have abandoned the Walter system for closed-cycle Diesel engines using pure oxygen from onboard tanks. The only boat, U-798, was still unfinished at the Krupp Germaniawerft at the end of the war.

== Completed boats ==
Three Type XVIIB boats were completed by Blohm + Voss of Hamburg between 1943 and 1945: U-1405, U-1406 and U-1407. U-1405 was completed in December 1944, U-1406 in February 1945, and U-1407 in March 1945.

A further three boats (U-1408 to U-1410) were under construction, but were not complete when the war ended. Another six Type XVIIB's (U-1411 to U-1416) were cancelled during the war in favour of the Type XXI submarine.

== Post war ==
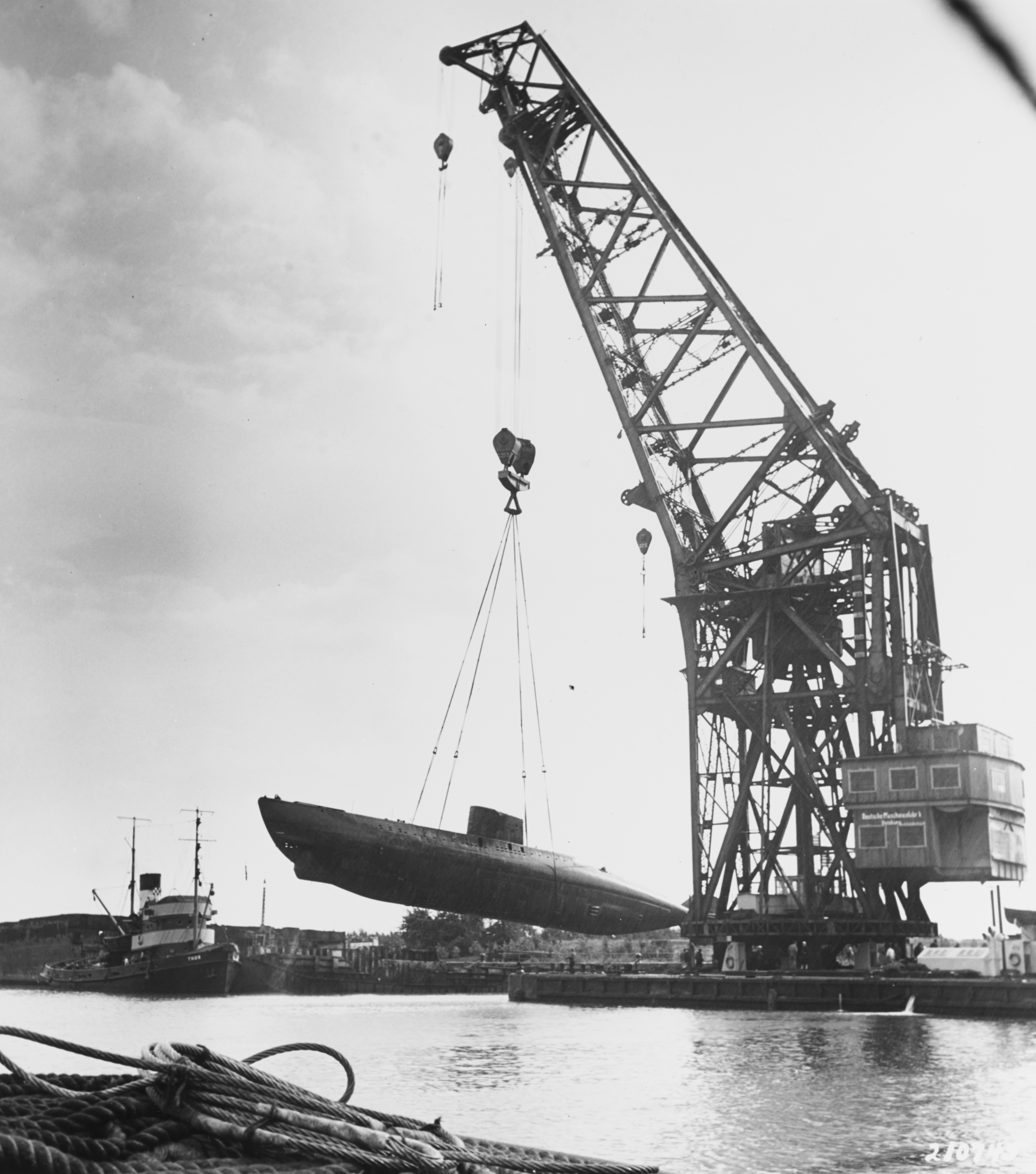
Type XVIIB boat (probably U-1406 or U-1407) raised by floating crane in Bremerhaven, August, 1945

All three completed Type XVIIB boats were scuttled by their crews at the end of World War II, U-1405 at Flensburg, and U-1406 and U-1407 at Cuxhaven, all in the British Zone of Occupation. U-1406 and U-1407 were scuttled on 7 May 1945 by Oberleutnant zur See Gerhard Grumpelt, even though a superior officer, Kapitän zur See Kurt Thoma, had prohibited such actions. Grumpelt was subsequently sentenced to seven years imprisonment by a British military court.

At the Potsdam Conference in July 1945 U-1406 was allocated to the United States and U-1407 to Britain, and both were soon salvaged. The uncompleted U-1408 and U-1410 were discovered by British forces at the Blohm + Voss yard in Hamburg.

The United States Navy did not repair and operate U-1406 as it had with the two Type XXI submarines it had captured. She travelled to the United States as deck cargo, having been stripped after being damaged by fire and twice flooded. Portsmouth Naval Shipyard estimated it would cost $1 million to put her into service, but plans to do so were rejected due to the perceived fire hazard and high cost of HTP, and she was broken up in New York harbour some time after 18 May 1948.

The Royal Navy repaired U-1407 and recommissioned her on 25 September 1945 as HMS Meteorite. She served as the model for two further HTP boats, the Explorer-class submarines, HMS Explorer and HMS Excalibur.

== List of boats ==
Wa 201 — Blohm + Voss, Hamburg

- U-792 — only used as a trials vessel; scuttled on 4 May 1945
- U-793 — only used as a trials vessel; scuttled on 4 May 1945

Wk 202 — Germaniawerft, Kiel

- U-794 — only used as a trials vessel; scuttled on 5 May 1945
- U-795 — only used as a trials vessel; scuttled on 3 May 1945

Type XVIIB — Blohm + Voss, Hamburg

- U-1405 — scuttled on 5 May 1945
- U-1406 — scuttled on 7 May 1945, raised, and transported to the U.S.; broken up some time after 18 May 1948
- U-1407 — scuttled on 7 May 1945, raised, repaired and served as HMS Meteorite until September 1949
- U-1408 – 1410 — incomplete when the war ended
- U-1411 – 1416 — contract cancelled before construction began

== Specifications ==
Class	Wa 201	Wk 202	XVIIB
Displacement surfaced in t (long tons)	277 (273)	236 (232)	312 (307)
Displacement submerged in t (long tons)	309 (304)	259 (255)	337 (332)
Length overall in m (ft)	39.05 (128.1)	34.64 (113.6)	41.45 (136.0)
Length pressure hull in m (ft)	26.15 (85.8)	--	27.30 (89.6)
Beam overall in m (ft)	4.50 (14.8)	4.50 (14.8)	4.50 (14.8)
Beam pressure hull in m (ft)	3.30 (10.8)	3.40 (11.2)	3.30 (10.8)
Draft in m (ft)	4.30 (14.1)	4.55 (14.9)	4.50 (14.8)
Surface speed in knots (km/h, mph)	9.0 (16.7; 10.4)	9.0 (16.7; 10.4)	8.8 (16.3; 10.1)
Submerged speed in knots (km/h, mph) on Walter drive	25.0 (46.3; 28.8)	26.0 (48.2; 29.9)	20.0 (37.0; 23.0)
Submerged speed in knots (km/h, mph) on electric drive	4.5 (8.3; 5.2)	5.0 (9.3; 5.8)	4.5 (8.3; 5.2)
Power surfaced (diesel) in hp (kW)	230 (170)	230 (170)	230 (170)
Power submerged (Walter) in hp (kW)	5,000 (3,700)	5,000 (3,700)	2.500 (1.864)
Power submerged (electric) in hp (kW)	76 (57)	76 (57)	76 (57)
Surface range in nmi (km, mi)	2,910 (5,390; 3,350) at 9 knots	1,840 (3,410; 2,120) at 9 knots	2,970 (5,500; 3,420) at 8.5 knots
Submerged range in nmi (km, mi) on Walter drive	27 (50; 31) at 4.5 knots	76 (141; 87) at 4 knots	40 (74; 46) at 4.5 knots
Submerged range in nmi (km, mi) on electric drive	105 (194; 121) at 25 knots 127 (235; 146) at 20 knots	80 (150; 92) at 26 knots	114 (211; 131) at 20 knots 169 (313; 194) at 15 knots

== Bibliography ==
- Möller, Eberhard; Brack, Werner (2004). The Encyclopedia of U-Boats. London: Chatham. ISBN 1-85367-623-3.
- Polmar, Norman; Kenneth, J. Moore (2004). Cold War Submarines: The Design and Construction of U.S. and Soviet Submarines. Brassey's. ISBN 1-57488-594-4.
- Rössler, Eberhard (2001). The U-boat: The evolution and technical history of German submarines. London: Cassell & Co. ISBN 0-304-36120-8.
- Rössler, Eberhard. Vom Original zum Modell UBoottyp XVII Walter Uboote (in German). Bernard & Graefe.
- Williamson, Gordon (2005). Wolf pack: The story of the U-boat in World War II. Oxford: Osprey Publishing. ISBN 1-84176-872-3.
