= 30 =

30 may refer to:

- 30 (number), the natural number following 29 and preceding 31
- one of the years 30 BC, AD 30, 1930, 2030

== Science ==
- Zinc, a transition metal in the periodic table
- 30 Urania, an asteroid in the asteroid belt

== Music ==
- 30 (Harry Connick Jr. album), 2001
- 30 (album), by Adele, 2021
- 30 (Sungjin album), 2024
- 30: Very Best of Deep Purple, 1998
- Thyrty: The 30th Anniversary Collection, by Lynyrd Skynyrd, 2003
- 30, a 1997 album by Laurent Garnier
- 30, a 2004 album by James Yorkston
- 30, a 2006 album by Jerusalem, also called Tretti
- 30, a 2014 compilation album by Modern Talking
- 30, a 2016 album by Trio da Paz
- "Thirty", a 2019 album by Strings
- "Thirty", a song by Karma to Burn from the album Wild, Wonderful Purgatory, 1999
- "30", a 2011 song by Danny Brown from the album XXX
- "30", a 2021 song by Bo Burnham from the special Bo Burnham: Inside
- "30", a 2021 song by Pop Smoke from the album Faith
- "30", a 2022 song by Nas from the album King's Disease III

== Other uses ==
- "-30-", traditionally used by journalists in North America to indicate the end of a story
- -30- (film), 1959, also released as Deadline Midnight
- 30 (Law & Order: Criminal Intent), an episode of the television series Law & Order: Criminal Intent
- –30– (The Wire), the series finale of the HBO original series The Wire
- 30 (tennis), a score indicating two points won
- 30 caliber
- Tatra 30, an automobile produced by Tatra
- Renault 30, an executive hatchback produced by Renault
- The international calling code for Greece

== See also ==
- 30th (disambiguation)
- The Thirty (disambiguation)
- XXX (disambiguation), Roman numeral representation of 30
- 30 Roc, American music producer
- List of highways numbered 30
