= Howard Vincent O'Brien =

American novelist

Howard Vincent O’Brien (1888–1947) was an American novelist and journalist best known for his memoir Wine, Women and War and his columns for the Chicago Daily News, "All Things Considered" and "Footnotes". O’Brien was born in Chicago in 1888, where he lived for his entire life, save for his time at Yale University and fighting in World War I.

O’Brien worked as an editor of the Printers' Ink magazine, and moved on from this endeavor to found Art magazine before becoming a first lieutenant of artillery in World War I. By 1920, he had written several novels, including Trodden Gold, An Abandoned Woman, Thirty, and his anonymous autobiography, Wine, Women, and War. He became the literary editor of the Chicago Daily News in 1928, where he also contributed the column "All Things Considered", which he wrote until his death in 1947.
