= Hellmuth Walter =

German rocket scientist

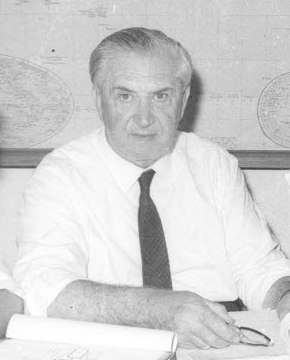
- Hellmuth Walter
- Born: 26 August 1900; Wedel, Schleswig-Holstein, Germany
- Died: 16 December 1980 (aged 80); Upper Montclair, New Jersey, United States
- Education: Technische Universität Berlin
- Known for: Walter engine
- Scientific career
- Fields: Engineering

Hellmuth Walter (26 August 1900 – 16 December 1980) was a German engineer who pioneered research into rocket engines and gas turbines. His most noteworthy contributions were rocket motors for the Messerschmitt Me 163 and Bachem Ba 349 interceptor aircraft, so-called Starthilfe jettisonable rocket propulsion units used for a variety of Luftwaffe aircraft during World War II, and a revolutionary new propulsion system for submarines known as air-independent propulsion (AIP).

== Early life ==
Walter began training as a machinist in 1917 in Hamburg and in 1921 commenced studies in mechanical engineering at the Technische Hochschule in Charlottenburg (now Technische Universität Berlin). He left before completing these studies, however, in order to take up a position at the Stettiner Maschinenbau AG Vulcan, a major shipyard. Walter's experience with marine engines here led him to become interested in overcoming some of the limitations of the internal combustion engine. He reasoned that an engine powered by a fuel source already rich with oxygen would not require an external supply of oxygen (from the atmosphere or from tanks). This would have obvious advantages for powering submarines and torpedoes.

Research suggested that hydrogen peroxide was a suitable monopropellant fuel—in the presence of a suitable catalyst it would break down into oxygen and steam at high temperature. The heat of the reaction would cause the oxygen and steam to expand, and this could be used as a source of pressure. Walter also realised that another fuel could be injected into this hot mixture of gases to provide combustion and therefore more power. He patented this idea in 1925.

== Entrepreneur ==
After working for some time at the Germaniawerft shipyard in Kiel, Walter branched out on his own in 1934 to form his own company, Hellmuth Walter Kommanditgesellschaft (HWK, or Walter-Werke), to further research and development of his ideas. That same year, he made a proposal to the Oberkommando der Kriegsmarine (OKM – Naval High Command) suggesting that a submarine powered by one of these engines would have considerable speed advantages over the conventional combination of diesel engine(s) for surface running and electric motor(s) while submerged. The proposal was met with much scepticism, but Walter persisted, and in 1937 showed his plans to Karl Dönitz, who was able to assist in obtaining a contract to produce a prototype. Construction started in 1939 on a small research submarine designated the V-80. When it was launched in 1940, the submarine demonstrated a top speed of 23 knots submerged, twice that of any submarine in the world at the time. Despite these spectacular results, problems with the production, supply, and safe handling of hydrogen peroxide prevented wide-scale implementation of Walter's revolutionary engine. In the end, only a handful of German Type XVII submarines were built using this engine, and none saw combat.

== Rocket engines ==
At the same time that Walter was developing submarine engines, he was also applying his ideas to rocketry. The high-pressure gas mixture created by the rapid decomposition of hydrogen peroxide could not only be used in a turbine, but if simply directed out of a nozzle, created considerable thrust. Wernher von Braun's rocketry team working at Peenemünde expressed interest in Walter's ideas, and in 1936 began a programme of installing Walter rockets into aircraft. The experimental results obtained by von Braun created interest among Germany's aircraft manufacturers, including Heinkel and Messerschmitt, and in 1939, the Heinkel He 176 became the first aircraft to fly on liquid-fuelled rocket power alone. This type of engine went on to become the cornerstone of the Messerschmitt Me 163 rocket-powered fighter, when married to Alexander Lippisch's revolutionary airframe design. Throughout the course of World War II, Walter's aircraft engines became increasingly powerful and refined. The original design of simply decomposing hydrogen peroxide was soon changed to its use as an oxidizer (much like dinitrogen tetroxide would be used later) when combined with a hydrazine/methanol true rocket fuel designated C-Stoff, into the hot, high-pressure gases, and in later, never-deployed developments, a second, 400 kg (880 lb) thrust "cruising" combustion chamber, nicknamed a Marschofen, was added below the main chamber to allow for more precise control of the engine. Versions of this engine were intended to power a variety of aircraft design proposals and missile projects and was also licence-built in Japan (see HWK 109-509).

Another Walter engine was used to assist heavily laden aircraft to take off (JATO or RATO). When the rockets' fuel had run out, they would separate from the aircraft and return to the ground by parachute for refurbishment and re-use (see Walther HWK 109-500).

In 1945, Walter was awarded the Ritterkreuz des Kriegsverdienstkreuzes mit Schwertern for his wartime service. Walter was captured by a British Army unit named T-Force following a 60-mile advance behind German lines to prevent his research falling into the hands of the advancing Russians. His factory was then investigated by 30 Assault Unit, a unit of Royal Marines which had been established by James Bond author Ian Fleming.

== Post-war career ==
The end of the war saw all of his research materials confiscated by the British military and Walter and his colleagues taken to the UK to work for the Royal Navy. With Walter's co-operation, one of the German submarines using his drive, the U-1407 was raised from where it had been scuttled and re-commissioned as HMS Meteorite. The Royal Navy constructed two more submarines using AIP engines before abandoning research in this direction in favour of nuclear power.

Allowed to return to Germany in 1948, Walter worked for the Paul Seifert Engine Works. In 1950 he emigrated to the United States and joined the Worthington Pump Corporation of Harrison, New Jersey, eventually becoming vice president of research and development. In 1956 he founded the company Hellmuth Walter GmbH in Kiel, and in 1967 constructed a civilian submarine, STINT, with Walter propulsion.

== See also ==
- Walter engine
- List of German inventors and discoverers
