= 5th U-boat Flotilla =

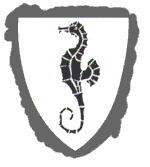
- Active: 1938–1940; 1941–1945
- Country: Nazi Germany
- Branch: Kriegsmarine
- Type: U-boat flotilla
- Garrison/HQ: Kiel
- Nickname(s): Emsmann Flotilla

Commanders
- Notable commanders: Korvettenkapitän Hans-Rudolf Rösing

The 5th U-boat Flotilla (German 5. Unterseebootsflottille), also known as Emsmann Flotilla, was a U-boat flotilla of Nazi Germany's Kriegsmarine during World War II.

The flotilla was formed in December 1938 in Kiel under the command of Korvettenkapitän Hans-Rudolf Rösing. It was named in honour of Oberleutnant zur See Hans Joachim Emsmann, a U-boat commander during World War I, who died on 28 October 1918 after his U-boat UB-116 was sunk by a mine. The flotilla was disbanded in January 1940 and the boats were all transferred to 1st Flotilla.

The flotilla was re-formed as "5th U-boat Flotilla" in June 1941 under the command of Kapitänleutnant Karl-Heinz Moehle as a training flotilla with her base in Kiel. In 1946 Moehle was sentenced to five years in prison, after being found guilty of passing the Laconia Order to new U-boat commanders before they went out on patrol. He was released in November 1949.

== Flotilla commanders ==
Duration	Commander
December 1938 – December 1939	Korvettenkapitän Hans-Rudolf Rösing
June 1941 – August 1942	Kapitänleutnant Karl-Heinz Moehle
September – November 1942	Korvettenkapitän Hans Pauckstadt (pro tem)
November 1942 – September 1943	Korvettenkapitän Karl-Heinz Moehle
September 1943 – October 1943	Kapitänleutnant Jost Metzler (pro tem)
October 1943 – May 1945	Korvettenkapitän Karl-Heinz Moehle
