= List of shipwrecks in May 1945 =

The list of shipwrecks in May 1945 includes ships sunk, foundered, grounded, or otherwise lost during May 1945.

== 1 May ==
List of shipwrecks: 1 May 1945
Ship	State	Description
AF 106	Kriegsmarine	The Artilleriefährprahm (168 GRT) ran aground under fire from Soviet tanks in the Peene near Zemitz, Germany. Her crew lost one dead and two wounded and scuttled her the next night after attempts to recover her failed.
Argo	Germany	World War II: The Argo-class submarine was scuttled at Monfalcone, Friuli-Venezia Giulia, Italy.
CD-50	Imperial Japanese Navy	World War II: The Type D escort ship was torpedoed and damaged in the Pacific Ocean off Sasumi (34°15′N 135°05′E) by USS Sennet (United States Navy) and beached. Nine crewmen were killed. Refloated sometime in May and towed to Osaka. Repairs not finished at end of the war, scrapped May 1948.
Chowa Maru	Imperial Japanese Navy	World War II: The Chowa Maru-class transport (2,719 GRT) was torpedoed and sunk in the Pacific Ocean 54 nautical miles (100 km) south east of Hokkaido (41°02′N 144°36′E) by USS Bowfin (United States Navy). Forty-one crewmen were killed.
F 193	Kriegsmarine	The Type AM minelayer Marinefahrprahm was sunk by a mine near Kolberg with the loss of 11 lives.
F 971	Kriegsmarine	The Type D Marinefahrprahm was sunk on this date.
F 975	Kriegsmarine	The Type D Marinefahrprahm was sunk on this date.
F 1042	Kriegsmarine	The Type DM minelayer Marinefahrprahm was sunk on this date.
F 1047	Kriegsmarine	The Type DM minelayer Marinefahrprahm (215 GRT) was scuttled near Montfalcone, Italy.
Kiebitz	Kriegsmarine	World War II: The minelayer was scuttled at Trieste, Italy. She was subsequently refloated, repaired and entered Yugoslav service in 1950 as Galeb.
Neuralia	United Kingdom	World War II: The troopship struck a mine and sank in the Mediterranean Sea (40°11′N 17°44′E) with the loss of four of the 277 people on board.
Prinses Beatrix	Kriegsmarine	World War II: The Marinefährprahm was bombed and sunk off Bornholm, Denmark by Soviet aircraft.
S 157	Kriegsmarine	World War II: The TM-class motor torpedo boat was sunk west of Trieste, Italy by Yugoslav Partisan mortar fire. Three crewmen were killed.
SAT 16 Westflandern	Kriegsmarine	World War II: The Marinefährprahm (345 GRT) was bombed and sunk off Nexø, Bornholm Island, Denmark by Soviet aircraft with the loss of 9 lives. She was raised and repaired in 1946.
TA40	Kriegsmarine	World War II: The Ariete-class torpedo boat was scuttled at Trieste.
TA41	Kriegsmarine	World War II: The Ariete-class torpedo boat was scuttled at Trieste.
TA43	Kriegsmarine	World War II: The torpedo boat, a former Beograd-class destroyer, was scuttled at Trieste.
TS 13	Germany	World War II: The incomplete Type 1940 minesweeper was scuttled.
U-3006	Kriegsmarine	End of World War II: The Type XXI submarine was scuttled at Wilhelmshaven, Lower Saxony. The wreck was scrapped post-war.
U-3009	Kriegsmarine	End of World War II: The Type XXI submarine was scuttled at Wesermünde, Bremen. The wreck was scrapped post-war.
USS YC-961	United States Navy	The non-self-propelled open lighter was wrecked off Biorka Island near Sitka, Territory of Alaska.

== 2 May ==
List of shipwrecks: 2 May 1945
Ship	State	Description
Admiral Hipper	Kriegsmarine	End of World War II: The Admiral Hipper-class cruiser was scuttled at Kiel, Schleswig-Holstein.
HMT Ebor Wyke	Royal Navy	World War II: The naval trawler (348 GRT, 1929) was torpedoed and sunk in the Atlantic Ocean 7 nautical miles (13 km) off Skagi, Iceland (64°10′N 23°12′W) by U-979 (Kriegsmarine) with the loss of 23 of her 24 crew.
Edmund F. Dickens	United States	World War II: The Liberty ship struck a mine and was severely damaged at Manila, Philippines. She was declared a constructive total loss.
F 944	Kriegsmarine	The Type DM minelayer Marinefahrprahm (215/256 t, 1944) was sunk on this date.
F 1044	Kriegsmarine	The Type DM minelayer Marinefahrprahm (215/256 t, 1944) was sunk on this date.
Florida	Germany	World War II: The cargo ship was sunk in the Bay of Lübeck by Hawker Typhoon aircraft of the Second Tactical Air Force, Royal Air Force.
GD 95	Kriegsmarine	World War II: The KSK-2-class naval drifter/submarine chaser (110 t, 1943) was scuttled on this date.
Gertrud Fritzen	Germany	World War II: The cargo ship was damaged at Travemünde in an attack by Allied aircraft. Following a subsequent attack at Lübeck, she was declared a constructive total loss.
Kieblitz	Kriegsmarine	World War II: The Fasana-class minelayer was scuttled in the Tagliemento Estuary.
HMS LCT 1238	Royal Navy	The landing craft tank (350/586 t, 1944) was lost on this date.
M-293	Kriegsmarine	World War II: The Type 1940 minesweeper (543/775 t, 1944) was bombed and sunk in the Kattegat by de Havilland Mosquito aircraft of 143, 235, 248, 333 Squadrons, Royal Air Force and 404 Squadron, Royal Canadian Air Force.
M-387	Kriegsmarine	World War II: The Type 1940 minesweeper (543/775 t, 1944) was scuttled at Lübeck, or sunk by Soviet Ilyushin Il-2 and Douglas A-20 Havoc aircraft.
Naomh Garbhan	Ireland	World War II: The fishing vessel Naomh Garbhan, working nine miles off Dungarvan, picked up a mine in her nets. It exploded, sinking it and killing three of the crew.
Ojika	Imperial Japanese Navy	World War II: The Ukuru-class escort ship (a.k.a. Oga) was torpedoed and sunk in the Yellow Sea by USS Springer (United States Navy). Lost with all 226 hands.
R-8, R-10 and R-16	Kriegsmarine	World War II: The Type R-2 minesweepers (63 t (R-8), 52.5 t (R-10, R-16), 1934) were scuttled in the Tagliamento Estuary.
RD 116	Kriegsmarine	World War II: The RD-class minesweeper (101/110 t, 1944) was scuttled.
Rezikan Maru	Japan	World War II: The cargo ship was torpedoed and sunk in the Yellow Sea by USS Raton (United States Navy).
Sperchios	Hellenic Navy	The minesweeper capsized due to weather and overloading north of Hydra island, Greece. 28 crew and between 60 and 90 passengers were lost. 9 crew and 26 passengers were rescued. Olympian Martin Nordenström was one of those who died.
Sperrbrecher 27 Heinrich	Kriegsmarine	World War II: The sperrbrecher was bombed and severely damaged in the Trave .
TA22	Kriegsmarine	World War II: The damaged and disarmed Pilo-class torpedo boat was scuttled at Trieste, Italy.
USS Thornton	United States Navy	The seaplane tender, a former Clemson-class destroyer, was beached and abandoned at Kerama Retto after suffering severe damage in a collision on 5 April 1945.
Toryu Maru	Japan	World War II: The tanker was torpedoed and sunk in the Yellow Sea by USS Raton (United States Navy).
TS-2	Kriegsmarine	World War II: The minesweeper was scuttled at Lübeck.
U-8	Kriegsmarine	End of World War II: The Type IIB submarine was scuttled at Wilhelmshaven, Lower Saxony.
U-14	Kriegsmarine	End of World War II: The Type IIB submarine was scuttled at Wilhelmshaven.
U-60	Kriegsmarine	End of World War II: The Type IIC submarine was scuttled at Wilhelmshaven.
U-61	Kriegsmarine	End of World War II: The Type IIC submarine was scuttled at Wilhelmshaven.
U-62	Kriegsmarine	End of World War II: The Type IIC submarine was scuttled at Wilhelmshaven.
U-71	Kriegsmarine	End of World War II: The Type VIIC submarine was scuttled at Wilhelmshaven.
U-72	Kriegsmarine	End of World War II: The Type VIIC submarine was scuttled at Wilhelmshaven.
U-120	Kriegsmarine	End of World War II: The Type IIB submarine was scuttled at Bremerhaven. The wreck was raised in 1950 and scrapped.
U-121	Kriegsmarine	End of World War II: The Type IIB submarine was scuttled at Bremerhaven. The wreck was raised in 1950 and scrapped.
U-137	Kriegsmarine	End of World War II: The Type IID submarine was scuttled at Wilhelmshaven. The wreck was later scrapped.
U-139	Kriegsmarine	End of World War II: The Type IID submarine was scuttled at Wilhelmshaven. The wreck was later scrapped.
U-140	Kriegsmarine	End of World War II: The Type IID submarine was scuttled at Wilhelmshaven. The wreck was later scrapped.
U-141	Kriegsmarine	End of World War II: The Type IID submarine was scuttled at Wilhelmshaven. The wreck was later scrapped.
U-142	Kriegsmarine	End of World War II: The Type IID submarine was scuttled at Wilhelmshaven. The wreck was later scrapped.
U-146	Kriegsmarine	End of World War II: The Type IID submarine was scuttled at Wilhelmshaven. The wreck was later scrapped.
U-148	Kriegsmarine	End of World War II: The Type IID submarine was scuttled at Wilhelmshaven. The wreck was later scrapped.
U-151	Kriegsmarine	End of World War II: The Type IID submarine was scuttled at Wilhelmshaven. The wreck was later scrapped.
U-152	Kriegsmarine	End of World War II: The Type IID submarine was scuttled at Wilhelmshaven. The wreck was later scrapped.
U-316	Kriegsmarine	End of World War II: The Type VIIC submarine was scuttled in the Baltic Sea off Travemünde, Lübeck (53°58′N 10°53′E).
U-552	Kriegsmarine	End of World War II: The Type VIIC submarine was scuttled off Wilhelmshaven (53°51′N 8°10′E).
U-554	Kriegsmarine	End of World War II: The Type VIIC submarine was scuttled of Wilhelmshaven (53°51′N 8°10′E).
U-612	Kriegsmarine	End of World War II: The Type VIIC submarine was scuttled off Warnemünde, Mecklenburg-Western Pomerania (54°11′N 12°05′E). The wreck was scrapped in 1946.
U-717	Kriegsmarine	End of World War II: The Type VIIC submarine was scuttled in the Wasserlebenbucht (54°49′N 9°27′E).
U-929	Kriegsmarine	End of World War II: The Type VIIC.41 submarine was scuttled at Warnemünde. The wreck was raised in 1956 and scrapped.
U-1007	Kriegsmarine	World War II: The Type VIIC/41 submarine was damaged in a rocket attack by Hawker Typhoon aircraft of 245 Squadron, Royal Air Force. She was consequently scuttled in the Trave River off Lübeck (53°54′N 10°51′E) with the loss of two of her crew. The wreck was raised in May 1946 and scrapped.
U-1308	Kriegsmarine	End of World War II: The Type VIIC/41 submarine was scuttled off Warnemünde (54°13′N 12°03′E). The wreck was raised in October 1952 and scrapped.
U-2327	Kriegsmarine	End of World War II: The Type XXIII submarine was scuttled at Hamburg. The wreck was scrapped post-war.
U-2359	Kriegsmarine	World War II: The Type XXIII submarine was sunk in the Kattegat (57°29′N 11°24′E) by a rocket attack by de Havilland Mosquito aircraft of 143, 235, 248 and 333 Squadrons, Royal Air Force and 404 Squadron, Royal Canadian Air Force with the loss of all twelve crew.
U-2510	Kriegsmarine	End of World War II: The Type XXI submarine was scuttled at Travemünde. The wreck was scrapped post-war.
U-2526	Kriegsmarine	End of World War II: The Type XXI submarine was scuttled at Travemünde. The wreck was scrapped post-war.
U-2527	Kriegsmarine	End of World War II: The Type XXI submarine was scuttled at Travemünde. The wreck was scrapped post-war.
U-2528	Kriegsmarine	End of World War II: The Type XXI submarine was scuttled at Travemünde. The wreck was scrapped post-war.
U-2531	Kriegsmarine	End of World War II: The Type XXI submarine was scuttled at Travemünde. The wreck was scrapped post-war.
U-3002	Kriegsmarine	End of World War II: The Type XXI submarine was scuttled at Travemünde. The wreck was scrapped post-war.
U-3016	Kriegsmarine	End of World War II: The Type XXI submarine was scuttled at Travemünde. The wreck was scrapped post-war.
U-3018	Kriegsmarine	End of World War II: The Type XXI submarine was scuttled at Travemünde. The wreck was scrapped post-war.
U-3019	Kriegsmarine	End of World War II: The Type XXI submarine was scuttled at Travemünde. The wreck was scrapped post-war.
U-3020	Kriegsmarine	End of World War II: The Type XXI submarine was scuttled at Travemünde. The wreck was scrapped post-war.
U-3021	Kriegsmarine	End of World War II: The Type XXI submarine was scuttled at Travemünde. The wreck was scrapped post-war.
U-3504	Kriegsmarine	End of World War II: The Type XXI submarine was scuttled at Wilhelmshaven. The wreck was scrapped post-war.
U-3516	Kriegsmarine	End of World War II: The Type XXI submarine was scuttled at Travemünde. The wreck was scrapped post-war.
U-3517	Kriegsmarine	End of World War II: The Type XXI submarine was scuttled at Travemünde. The wreck was scrapped post-war.
U-3521	Kriegsmarine	End of World War II: The Type XXI submarine was scuttled at Travemünde. The wreck was scrapped post-war.
U-3522	Kriegsmarine	End of World War II: The Type XXI submarine was scuttled at Travemünde. The wreck was scrapped post-war.
V 2001 Uranus	Kriegsmarine	World War II: The Vorpostenboot was sunk in the Baltic Sea by Soviet Douglas A-20 Havoc and Ilyushin Il-2 aircraft.
Wachschiff 9 Jaan	Kriegsmarine	World War II: The guard ship (1,142 GRT, 1920) was scuttled on this date.

== 3 May ==
List of shipwrecks: 3 May 1945
Ship	State	Description
Arcona	Kriegsmarine	World War II: The floating anti-aircraft battery was scuttled at Wilhelmshaven, Lower Saxony. Salvaged and scrapped in 1948.
Bremse	Kriegsmarine	World War II: The torpedo recovery vessel, a former V150-class torpedo boat, was scuttled at Kiel.
Cap Arcona	Kriegsmarine	Cap Arcona World War II: The ocean liner was sunk in the Bay of Lübeck by Hawker Typhoon aircraft of the Second Tactical Air Force, Royal Air Force with the loss of 5,594 lives. The wreck was broken up in 1949.
CD-25	Imperial Japanese Navy	World War II: The Type C escort ship was torpedoed and sunk in the Yellow Sea (33°56′N 122°49′E) by USS Springer (United States Navy) with all 175 hands.
Der Deutsche	Kriegsmarine	World War II: The transport ship was bombed off the Fehmarn Lightship (Germany) and was beached. She was declared a constructive total loss. She was salvaged in 1950, repaired and entered Soviet service as Asia.
Deutschland	Germany	World War II: The cargo liner was bombed in the Bay of Lübeck off Neustadt (54°03′N 10°48′E by Hawker Typhoon aircraft of the Second Tactical Air Force. She capsized and sank with loss of life. She was refloated in 1948 and scrapped.
Dorpat	Germany	World War II: The cargo ship was sunk south of the Great Belt by Hawker Typhoon aircraft of the Second Tactical Air Force. She was refloated later that year, repaired and entered Finnish service as Leila.
Dwarsee	Germany	World War II: The coaster was bombed and sunk in the Baltic Sea off Fehmarn by Hawker Typhoon aircraft of the Second Tactical Air Force.
Emden	Kriegsmarine	World War II: The cruiser was scuttled off Kiel, Schleswig-Holstein. The wreck was broken up in 1949.
Energie	Germany	World War II: The cargo ship was sunk in the Bay of Kiel by Hawker Typhoon aircraft of the Second Tactical Air Force.
Erna Gaulke	Germany	World War II: The coaster was bombed and sunk in the Baltic Sea off Fehmarn by Hawker Typhoon aircraft of the Second Tactical Air Force.
Hai	Kriegsmarine	World War II: The tender, a former F-class escort ship, was sunk at Kiel by Hawker Typhoon aircraft of the Second Tactical Air Force. Raised and scrapped in 1948.
Inster	Germany	World War II: The cargo ship was bombed and sunk in the Bay of Kiel (54°30.42′N 10°22.58′E) by Hawker Typhoon aircraft of the Second Tactical Air Force or by Bristol Beaufighter aircraft of 236 Squadron, Royal Air Force with the loss of 120 or 560 lives. The wreck was broken up in 1953.
Insterburg	Germany	World War II: The cargo ship was bombed and sunk in the Bay of Kiel by Hawker Typhoon aircraft of the Second Tactical Air Force.
Irmtraud Cords	Germany	World War II: The cargo ship was bombed and sunk in the Bay of Kiel by Hawker Typhoon aircraft of the Second Tactical Air Force.
KFK 390	Kriegsmarine	World War II: The KSK-2-class naval drifter/submarine chaser was scuttled on this date.
USS Lagarto	United States Navy	World War II: The Gato-class submarine was sunk in the Gulf of Siam (07°55′N 102°00′E) by Hatsutaka (Imperial Japanese Navy).
Leda	Germany	World War II: The coastal tanker was sunk in the Bay of Kiel by Hawker Typhoon aircraft of the Second Tactical Air Force.
USS Little	United States Navy	World War II: The Fletcher-class destroyer was sunk in the Pacific Ocean west of Okinawa (26°24′N 126°15′E) by a Japanese kamikaze attack.
USS LSM(R)-195	United States Navy	World War II: The LSM(R)-188-class landing ship medium was sunk in the Pacific Ocean off Okinawa by a Japanese kamikaze attack.
M-14	Kriegsmarine	World War II: The M-class minesweeper struck a mine and sank off Swinemünde, Pomerania.
M 301	Kriegsmarine	World War II: The minesweeper was sunk in the Kattegat by de Havilland Mosquito aircraft of the Royal Air Force.
Medusa	Kriegsmarine	World War II: The floating anti-aircraft battery was scuttled at Wilhelmshaven, Lower Saxony. Salvaged and scrapped in 1948–1950.
Musketier	Germany	World War II: The cargo ship was sunk in the Baltic Sea off Fehmarn by Hawker Typhoon aircraft of the Second Tactical Air Force. She had around 800 refugees aboard but there were no casualties.
Nordland	Kriegsmarine	World War II: The training ship was scuttled at Eckernförde, Schleswig-Holstein.
Ostwind	Germany	World War II: The passenger/cargo ship was bombed by aircraft off Fehmarn, Germany. Sank on 7 May 1945, raised and scrapped at Gdańsk, Poland in 1949.
Pallas	Germany	World War II: The coaster was bombed and sunk off Langesund, Norway by Bristol Beaufighter aircraft of 236 and 254 Squadrons, Royal Air Force.
S 201	Kriegsmarine	World War II: The Schnellboot was bombed and damaged at Kiel by de Havilland Mosquito aircraft of the Royal Air Force. she was scuttled due to damage sustained.
Schlesien	Kriegsmarine	World War II: The training ship, a former Deutschland-class battleship, struck a mine and was bombed by Soviet Douglas A-20 Havoc and Ilyushin Il-2 aircraft and was beached at Zinnowitz, Mecklnburg-Vorpommern. The wreck was broken up in 1949–1956.
Swakopmund	Kriegsmarine	World War II: The target ship (5,139 GRT) was sunk off Fehmarn by Hawker Typhoon aircraft of the Second Tactical Air Force. There were no casualties. The wreck was broken up in 1950.
T8	Kriegsmarine	World War II: The Type 35 torpedo boat was scuttled at Kiel (54°26′N 10°10′E).
T9	Kriegsmarine	World War II: The Type 35 torpedo boat was scuttled at Kiel (54°26′N 10°10′E) after being damaged by Soviet aircraft and then by Royal Air Force aircraft in a later air raid.
TA22	Kriegsmarine	World War II: The torpedo boat, a former Rosolino Pilo-class destroyer, was scuttled while laid up at Muggia, Italy.
TA46	Kriegsmarine	World War II: The incomplete Ariete-class torpedo boat was scuttled at Fiume, Italy. Raised post war, completed and put in service as Velebit (Yugoslav Navy).
TA47	Kriegsmarine	World War II: The incomplete Ariete-class torpedo boat was scuttled at Fiume, Italy. Raised post war, completed and put in service as Ucka (Yugoslav Navy).
Taifun	Kriegsmarine	World War II: The tanker was bombed and sunk off Kjelnør, Norway by Bristol Beaufighter aircraft of 236 and 254 Squadrons, Royal Air Force. She was salvaged in 1945, returned to her pre-war Norwegian owners and reverted to her previous name of Polykarp. She was repaired, and returned to service in 1947 as Wilstar.
TFA9	Kriegsmarine	World War II: The torpedo recovery Vessel, a former Dutch G-13-class torpedo boat was scuttled at Kiel. Raised post war and towed to Den Helder. Expended as a target in 1948.
Thielbek	Germany	World War II: The prisoner ship was sunk in the Bay of Lübeck off Neustadt by Hawker Typhoon aircraft of the Second Tactical Air Force. 2,750 prisoners lost their lives, with 50 surviving the sinking. Raised and repaired in 1949.
U-48	Kriegsmarine	End of World War II: The Type VIIB submarine was scuttled in the Bay of Lübeck.
U-52	Kriegsmarine	End of World War II: The Type VIIB submarine was scuttled at Kiel. The wreck was scrapped in 1946–47.
U-57	Kriegsmarine	End of World War II: The Type IIC submarine was scuttled at Kiel.
U-58	Kriegsmarine	End of World War II: The Type IIC submarine was scuttled at Kiel.
U-59	Kriegsmarine	End of World War II: The Type IIC submarine was scuttled at Kiel, Schleswig-Holstein.
U-101	Kriegsmarine	End of World War II: The decommissioned Type VIIB submarine was scuttled at Neustadt. The wreck was later scrapped.
U-323	Kriegsmarine	End of World War II: The Type VIIC/41 submarine was scuttled off Nordenham, Lower Saxony (53°30′N 8°30′E).
U-339	Kriegsmarine	World War II: The Type VIIC submarine was scuttled off Wilhelmshaven, Lower Saxony (53°31′N 8°10′E).
U-428	Kriegsmarine	World War II: The Type VIIC submarine was scuttled in the Nord-Ostsee Kanal at Audorf, Schleswig-Holstein (54°19′N 9°40′E).
U-446	Kriegsmarine	End of World War II: The Type VIIC submarine was scuttled off Kiel (59°19′N 10°10′E) with the loss of 23 of her 41 crew. The wreck was raised in 1947 and scrapped.
U-475	Kriegsmarine	End of World War II: The Type VIIC submarine was scuttled off Kiel (59°19′N 10°10′E). The wreck was raised in 1947 and scrapped.
U-560	Kriegsmarine	End of World War II: The Type VIIC submarine was scuttled off Kiel. The wreck was scrapped in 1946.
U-704	Kriegsmarine	End of World War II: The Type VIIC submarine was scuttled at Vegesack, Bremen. The wreck was scrapped in 1947.
U-708	Kriegsmarine	End of World War II: The Type VIIC submarine was scuttled at Wilhelmshaven. The wreck was scrapped in 1947.
U-747	Kriegsmarine	End of World War II: The Type VIIC submarine was scuttled after suffering heavy damage in an American air raid at Hamburg on 9 April 1945.
U-748	Kriegsmarine	End of World War II: The Type VIIC submarine was scuttled at Rendsburg, Schleswig-Holstein.
U-795	Kriegsmarine	End of World War II: The Type XVIIA submarine was scuttled in dry dock at Kiel.
U-822	Kriegsmarine	End of World War II: The Type VIIC submarine was scuttled at Wesermünde (53°32′N 8°35′E). The wreck was scrapped in 1948.
U-828	Kriegsmarine	End of World War II: The Type VIIC/41 submarine was scuttled at Wesermünde (53°32′N 8°35′E). The wreck was scrapped in 1948.
U-876	Kriegsmarine	End of World War II: The Type IXD2 submarine was scuttled at Eckernförde. The wreck was scrapped in 1947.
U-903	Kriegsmarine	End of World War II: The Type VIIC submarine was scuttled at Kiel. The wreck was scrapped in 1947.
U-922	Kriegsmarine	End of World War II: The Type VIIC submarine was scuttled at Kiel. The wreck was scrapped in 1947.
U-924	Kriegsmarine	End of World War II: The Type VIIC submarine was scuttled at Kiel. The wreck was scrapped in 1947.
U-958	Kriegsmarine	End of World War II: The Type VIIC submarine was scuttled at Kiel. The wreck was scrapped in 1947.
U-1170	Kriegsmarine	End of World War II: The Type VIIC/41 submarine was scuttled at Travemünde, Schleswig-Holstein. The wreck was scrapped post-war.
U-1192	Kriegsmarine	World War II: The Type VIIC submarine was scuttled at Kiel. The wreck was scrapped post-war.
U-1196	Kriegsmarine	End of World War II: The Type VIIC submarine was scuttled at Travemünde. The wreck was scrapped post-war.
U-1201	Kriegsmarine	End of World War II: The Type VIIC submarine was scuttled at Hamburg.
U-1205	Kriegsmarine	End of World War II: The Type VIIC submarine was scuttled at Kiel. The wreck was scrapped post-war.
U-1210	Kriegsmarine	World War II: The Type VIIC submarine was bombed and sunk in the Baltic Sea off Eckernförde (54°28′N 9°54′E) in an American air raid.
U-1227	Kriegsmarine	The Type IXC/40 submarine was scuttled at Kiel. The wreck was scrapped post-war.
U-1275	Kriegsmarine	End of World War II: The Type VIIC/41 submarine was scuttled at Kiel. The wreck was scrapped post-war.
U-2330	Kriegsmarine	End of World War II: The Type XXIII submarine was scuttled at Kiel. The wreck was scrapped post-war.
U-2332	Kriegsmarine	End of World War II: The Type XXIII submarine was scuttled at Hamburg. The wreck was scrapped post-war.
U-2355	Kriegsmarine	End of World War II: The Type XXIII submarine was scuttled in the Baltic Sea north west of Laboe, Schleswig-Holstein (54°24′N 10°12′E).
U-2371	Kriegsmarine	End of World War II: The Type XXIII submarine was scuttled at Hamburg. The wreck was scrapped post-war.
U-2501	Kriegsmarine	End of World War II: The Type XXI submarine was scuttled at Hamburg. The wreck was scrapped post-war.
U-2503	Kriegsmarine	World War II: The Type XXI submarine was damaged in the Little Belt in a rocket attack by two Bristol Beaufighter aircraft of 236 and 254 Squadrons, Royal Air Force with the loss of thirteen crew. She was consequently scuttled the next day at 55°37′N 10°00′E.
U-2504	Kriegsmarine	End of World War II: The Type XXI submarine was scuttled near Hamburg. The wreck was scrapped post-war.
U-2508	Kriegsmarine	End of World War II: The Type XXI submarine was scuttled near Keil. The wreck was scrapped post-war.
U-2512	Kriegsmarine	End of World War II: The Type XXI submarine was scuttled at Eckernförde. The wreck was scrapped post-war.
U-2519	Kriegsmarine	End of World War II: The Type XXI submarine was scuttled at Kiel. The wreck was scrapped post-war.
U-2520	Kriegsmarine	End of World War II: The Type XXI submarine was scuttled at Kiel. The wreck was scrapped post-war.
U-2521	Kriegsmarine	World War II: The Type XXI submarine was sunk in the Flensburg Fjord (54°49′N 9°50′E) by a rocket attack by Hawker Typhoon aircraft of 184 Squadron, Royal Air Force with the loss of all 44 crew.
U-2524	Kriegsmarine	World War II: The Type XXI submarine was damaged in the Kattegat by a rocket attack by Bristol Beaufighter aircraft of 236 and 254 Squadrons, Royal Air Force. She was consequently scuttled off Fehmarn (54°26′N 11°39′E) with the loss of one crew member.
U-2533	Kriegsmarine	End of World War II: The Type XXI submarine was scuttled at Travemünde. The wreck was scrapped post-war.
U-2534	Kriegsmarine	End of World War II: The Type XXI submarine was scuttled east of Fehmarn (54°26′N 11°34′E).
U-2535	Kriegsmarine	End of World War II: The Type XXI submarine was scuttled at Travemünde. The wreck was scrapped post-war.
U-2536	Kriegsmarine	End of World War II: The Type XXI submarine was scuttled at Travemünde. The wreck was scrapped post-war.
U-2539	Kriegsmarine	End of World War II: The Type XXI submarine was scuttled at Kiel. The wreck was scrapped post-war.
U-2543	Kriegsmarine	End of World War II: The Type XXI submarine was scuttled at Kiel. The wreck was scrapped post-war.
U-2545	Kriegsmarine	End of World War II: The Type XXI submarine was scuttled at Kiel. The wreck was scrapped post-war.
U-2546	Kriegsmarine	End of World War II: The Type XXI submarine was scuttled at Kiel. The wreck was scrapped post-war.
U-2548	Kriegsmarine	End of World War II: The Type XXI submarine was scuttled at Kiel. The wreck was scrapped post-war.
U-2552	Kriegsmarine	End of World War II: The Type XXI submarine was scuttled at Kiel (54°21′01″N 10°09′06″E). The wreck was scrapped post-war.
U-3001	Kriegsmarine	End of World War II: The Type XXI submarine was scuttled in the North Sea north west of Wesermünde. The wreck was scrapped post-war.
U-3005	Kriegsmarine	End of World War II: The Type XXI submarine was scuttled at Kiel. The wreck was scrapped post-war.
U-3010	Kriegsmarine	End of World War II: The Type XXI submarine was scuttled at Kiel. The wreck was scrapped post-war.
U-3011	Kriegsmarine	End of World War II: The Type XXI submarine was scuttled at Travemünde. The wreck was scrapped post-war.
U-3012	Kriegsmarine	End of World War II: The Type XXI submarine was scuttled at Travemünde. The wreck was scrapped post-war.
U-3013	Kriegsmarine	End of World War II: The Type XXI submarine was scuttled at Travemünde. The wreck was scrapped post-war.
U-3014	Kriegsmarine	End of World War II: The Type XXI submarine was scuttled at Neustadt, Hamburg. The wreck was scrapped post-war.
U-3023	Kriegsmarine	End of World War II: The Type XXI submarine was scuttled at Travemünde. The wreck was scrapped post-war.
U-3024	Kriegsmarine	End of World War II: The Type XXI submarine was scuttled at Neustadt. The wreck was scrapped post-war.
U-3025	Kriegsmarine	End of World War II: The Type XXI submarine was scuttled at Travemünde. The wreck was scrapped post-war.
U-3026	Kriegsmarine	End of World War II: The Type XXI submarine was scuttled at Travemünde. The wreck was scrapped post-war.
U-3027	Kriegsmarine	End of World War II: The Type XXI submarine was scuttled at Travemünde. The wreck was scrapped post-war.
U-3028	Kriegsmarine	End of World War II: The Type XXI submarine was scuttled at Kiel. The wreck was scrapped post-war.
U-3029	Kriegsmarine	End of World War II: The Type XXI submarine was scuttled in the Aussenförde, Kiel.
U-3031	Kriegsmarine	End of World War II: The Type XXI submarine was scuttled at Kiel.
U-3032	Kriegsmarine	World War II: The Type XXI submarine was sunk in the Baltic Sea east of Fehmarn (54°26′30″N 11°32′12″E) by a rocket attack by Hawker Typhoon aircraft of 184 Squadron, Royal Air Force with the loss of 36 of her 60 crew.
U-3037	Kriegsmarine	End of World War II: The Type XXI submarine was scuttled at Travemünde. The wreck was scrapped post-war.
U-3038	Kriegsmarine	End of World War II: The Type XXI submarine was scuttled at Kiel. The wreck was scrapped post-war.
U-3039	Kriegsmarine	End of World War II: The Type XXI submarine was scuttled at Kiel. The wreck was scrapped post-war.
U-3040	Kriegsmarine	End of World War II: The Type XXI submarine was scuttled at Kiel. The wreck was scrapped post-war.
U-3507	Kriegsmarine	End of World War II: The Type XXI submarine was scuttled at Travemünde. The wreck was scrapped post-war.
U-3509	Kriegsmarine	End of World War II: The Type XXI submarine was scuttled in the Weser Estuary.
U-3511	Kriegsmarine	End of World War II: The Type XXI submarine was scuttled at Travemünde.
U-3513	Kriegsmarine	End of World War II: The Type XXI submarine was scuttled at Travemünde.
U-3518	Kriegsmarine	End of World War II: The Type XXI submarine was scuttled at Kiel. The wreck was scrapped post-war.
U-3525	Kriegsmarine	End of World War II: The Type XXI submarine was scuttled at Kiel, Schleswig-Holstein.
U-3530	Kriegsmarine	End of World War II: The Type XXI submarine was scuttled at Kiel. The wreck was scrapped post-war.
U-4705	Kriegsmarine	End of World War II: The Type XXIII submarine was scuttled at Kiel. The wreck was scrapped post-war.
U-4712	Kriegsmarine	End of World War II: The Type XXIII submarine was scuttled at Kiel. The wreck was scrapped post-war.
UA	Kriegsmarine	End of World War II: This submarine was scuttled at Kiel. The wreck was scrapped post-war.
UB	Kriegsmarine	End of World War II: The Grampus-class submarine was scuttled in Heikendorf Bay, Kiel (54°22′N 10°11′E). The wreck was salvaged and scrapped post-war.
UC-2	Kriegsmarine	End of World War II: The B-class submarine was scuttled at Kiel, Germany. The wreck was raised and scrapped post-war.
UD-1	Kriegsmarine	End of World War II: The H-class submarine was scuttled at Kiel. The wreck was scrapped post-war.
UD-2	Kriegsmarine	End of World War II: The O 12-class submarine was scuttled at Kiel. The wreck was scrapped post-war.
UD-3	Kriegsmarine	End of World War II: The O 21-class submarine was scuttled at Kiel. The wreck was scrapped post-war.
UD-4	Kriegsmarine	End of World War II: The O 21-class submarine was scuttled at Kiel. The wreck was scrapped post-war.
Vega	Germany	World War II: The cargo ship was sunk in the Baltic Sea off Fehmarn by Hawker Typhoon aircraft of the Second Tactical Air Force.
Wolgast	Germany	World War II: The coaster was sunk in the Bay of Kiel by Hawker Typhoon aircraft of the Second Tactical Air Force.
USS YMS-481	United States Navy	World War II: The auxiliary minesweeper was shelled and sunk off Cape Djoeta, Borneo by Japanese shore-based artillery. Nineteen survivors were rescued by USS Cofer (United States Navy).
Z43	Kriegsmarine	World War II: The incomplete Type 1936B destroyer was scuttled in the Geltinger Bucht.

== 4 May ==
List of shipwrecks: 4 May 1945
Ship	State	Description
Altengamme	Kriegsmarine	World War II: The tanker was bombed and sunk by Soviet aircraft off Neu Mukran, Rügen. The wreck was refloated in 1950 and scrapped.
Black Watch	Kriegsmarine	World War II: Operation Judgement: The accommodation ship was bombed and sunk at Kilbotn, Norway by Grumman TBF Avenger and Grumman F4F Wildcat aircraft of 846, 853 and 882 Squadrons, Fleet Air Arm; based on HMS Trumpeter, HMS Queen and HMS Searcher (all Royal Navy) respectively.
Bolkoburg	Germany	World War II: The cargo ship was bombed and damaged in the Baltic Sea off Fehmarn, Schleswig-Holstein by Hawker Typhoon aircraft of 193 Squadron, Royal Air Force. She was beached and burnt out.
USS Carina	United States Navy	The Crater-class cargo ship was severely damaged at Okinawa, Japan by a Japanese PT boat suicide attack.
Else Hugo Stinnes 15	Germany	World War II: The salvage ship was torpedoed sunk in the Kattegat off Årø, Denmark by Allied aircraft. She was later refloated, repaired and entered American service.
Ernst Hugo Stinnes 11	Nazi Germany	World War II: The salvage ship was torpedoed sunk in the Kattegat off Årø by de Havilland Mosquito aircraft of Coastal Command, Royal Air Force. She was subsequently refloated, repaired and entered West German service in 1947 as Rhein.
Empire Unity	United Kingdom	World War II: The cargo ship was torpedoed by U-979 (Kriegsmarine) south west of Iceland (64°23′N 22°37′W) and was abandoned by her crew. Empire Unity was on a voyage from Hvalfjörður, Iceland to a British port. She was subsequently reboarded and towed in to Hvitanes, Iceland. Subsequently repaired and returned to service.
Freiburg	Kriegsmarine	World War II: The school ship was bombed in the Bay of Kiel by Hawker Typhoon aircraft of the Second Tactical Air Force. She was set afire and beached at Eckernförde, where she burnt out.
Grudziadz	Germany	World War II: The coaster was sunk in the Bay of Kiel by Hawker Typhoon aircraft of the Second Tactical Air Force, Royal Air Force.
Hektor	Kriegsmarine	World War II: The training ship was bombed and severely damaged by Soviet aircraft off Swinemünde (53°57′N 14°17′E). She was beached with the loss of more than 150 lives. She was refloated in 1952 and scrapped.
Helga Schröder	Germany	World War II: The cargo ship was sunk in Fehmarnsund by Hawker Typhoon aircraft of the Second Tactical Air Force.
Hummel	Kriegsmarine	World War II: The anti-aircraft vessel was bombed and sunk by Soviet aircraft at Swinemünde, Germany.
Iyasaka Maru No. 2	Japan	World War II: The tanker struck a mine and sank off Singapore.
K 1	Kriegsmarine	World War II: The gunboat was sunk in the Kattegat off Årø by de Havilland Mosquito aircraft of Coastal Command.
KT-140	Soviet Navy	The K-15/M-17-class river minesweeping launch was sunk on this date.
USS LCT-1358	United States Navy	The landing craft tank ran aground and sank off California.
USS LSM(R)-190	United States Navy	World War II: The LSM(R)-188-class landing ship medium was sunk in the Pacific Ocean off Okinawa, Japan by a kamikaze aircraft attack.
USS LSM(R)-194	United States Navy	World War II: The LSM(R)-188-class landing ship medium was sunk in the Pacific Ocean off Okinawa, Japan by a kamikaze aircraft attack.
USS Luce	United States Navy	World War II: The Fletcher-class destroyer was sunk in the Pacific Ocean off the Kerama Islands by a kamikaze aircraft attack with the loss of 126 of her 312 crew.
M-36	Kriegsmarine	World War II: The M 1935 minesweeper was bombed and sunk in the Great Belt by Bristol Beaufighter aircraft of 236 and 254 Squadrons, Royal Air Force.
M-301	Kriegsmarine	World War II: The Type 1940 minesweeper was bombed and sunk by aircraft south of Skjernøy, Norway.
USS Morrison	United States Navy	World War II: The Fletcher-class destroyer was sunk in the Pacific Ocean off Oshima, Japan (27°10′N 127°58′E) by a kamikaze aircraft attack with the loss of 152 of her 273 crew.
Orion	Kriegsmarine	World War II: The refugee transport was bombed and sunk by Soviet Douglas A-20 Havoc aircraft off Swinemünde, Pomerania.
Ostwind	Germany	World War II: The cargo ship was sunk in the Baltic Sea by Hawker Typhoon aircraft of the Second Tactical Air Force.
USS PGM-17	United States Navy	World War II: The PGM-9-class gunboat ran aground off Okinawa, refloated later and scuttled.
R-104	Kriegsmarine	World War II: The Type R-41 minesweeper was scuttled at Kiel, Schleswig-Holstein.
R-247	Kriegsmarine	World War II: The Type R-218 minesweeper was scuttled at Kiel.
S-103	Kriegsmarine	World War II: The Type 1939/40 Schnellboot was sunk in the Little Belt (54°56′N 10°02′E) by Hawker Typhoon aircraft of the Second Tactical Air Force with the loss of 18 lives.
Senja	Germany	World War II: Operation Judgement The coaster was bombed and sunk at Kilbotn by Grumman TBF Avenger and Grumman F4F Wildcat of 846, 853 and 882 Squadrons, Fleet Air Arm, based on HMS Trumpeter, HMS Queen and HMS Searcher (all Royal Navy) respectively. Raised in 1947, repaired and returned to service in April 1948.
Shinpen Maru	Japan	World War II: The coaster was torpedoed and sunk in the Pacific Ocean off Yamada Bay, Honshu (39°28′N 142°04′E) by USS Cero (United States Navy).
Two Shin'yō suicide motorboats	Imperial Japanese Navy	World War II: The Maru-Ni suicide boats were shelled and sunk by USS PC-469 (United States Navy) in Nagagusuku Bay, Okinawa.
Swakopmund	Germany	World War II: The cargo ship was bombed and sunk off Fehmarn by Hawker Typhoon aircraft of 183 Squadron, RAF.
T-155	Kriegsmarine	World War II: The torpedo recovery vessel, a former V150-class torpedo boat, was bombed and sunk by Soviet aircraft at Swinemunde.
U-30	Kriegsmarine	World War II: Operation Regenbogen: The Type VIIA submarine was scuttled at Flensburg, Schleswig-Holstein. The wreck was raised and scrapped in 1948.
U-46	Kriegsmarine	End of World War II: The Type VIIB submarine was scuttled in Kupfermühlen Bay (54°50′N 9°29′E).
U-267	Kriegsmarine	End of World War II: The Type VIIC submarine was scuttled in the Geltinger Bucht. The wreck was later scrapped.
U-393	Kriegsmarine	World War II: The Type VIIC submarine was attacked in the Geltinger Bucht (54°53′N 9°37′E) by United States Navy aircraft with the loss of two crew. She was scuttled the next day in Flensburger Förde (55°34′N 9°49′E).
U-711	Kriegsmarine	World War II: Operation Judgement: The Type VIIC submarine was bombed and sunk at Kilbotn by Grumman TBF Avenger and Grumman F4F Wildcat aircraft of 846, 853 and 882 Squadrons, Fleet Air Arm, based on HMS Trumpeter, HMS Queen and HMS Searcher (all Royal Navy) respectively with, the loss of 40 of her 52 crew.
U-721	Kriegsmarine	End of World War II: The Type VIIC submarine was scuttled in the Geltinger Bucht. The wreck was later scrapped.
U-792	Kriegsmarine	World War II: The Type XVIIA submarine was scuttled off Rendsborg, Schleswig-Holstein (54°19′N 9°43′E).
U-793	Kriegsmarine	End of World War II: The Type XVIIA submarine was scuttled off Rendsborg (54°19′N 9°43′E).
U-904	Kriegsmarine	End of World War II: The Type VIIC submarine was scuttled at Eckernförde (54°28′N 9°51′E).
U-1132	Kriegsmarine	End of World War II: The Type VIIC submarine was scuttled in Küpfermühlen Bay. The wreck was scrapped post-war.
U-1161	Kriegsmarine	End of World War II: The Type VIIC submarine was scuttled in Küpfermühlen Bay. The wreck was scrapped post-war.
U-1168	Kriegsmarine	End of World War II: The Type VIIC/41 submarine ran aground in the Geltinger Bucht (54°48′N 9°48′E) and was scuttled.
U-1303	Kriegsmarine	End of World War II: The Type VIIC submarine was scuttled in Küpfermühlen Bay. The wreck was scrapped post-war.
U-1304	Kriegsmarine	End of World War II: The Type VIIC submarine was scuttled in Küpfermühlen Bay. The wreck was scrapped post-war.
U-2338	Kriegsmarine	World War II: The Type XXIII submarine was sunk in the Øresund off Copenhagen (55°34′N 9°49′E by Bristol Beaufighter aircraft of 236 and 254 Squadrons, Royal Air Force with the loss of twelve of her thirteen crew.
U-2540	Kriegsmarine	End of World War II: The Type XXI submarine was scuttled in the Baltic Sea off the Flensburg Lightship (Germany). She was raised in 1957, repaired and entered Bundesmarine service in September 1960 as Wilhelm Bauer.
U-3033	Kriegsmarine	Endo of World War II: The Type XXI submarine was scuttled in Wasserleben Bay. The wreck was scrapped post-war.
U-3034	Kriegsmarine	Endo of World War II: The Type XXI submarine was scuttled in Wasserleben Bay. The wreck was scrapped post-war.
U-4709	Kriegsmarine	End of World War II: The Type XXIII submarine was scuttled at Kiel. The wreck was scrapped post-war.
U-4711	Kriegsmarine	End of World War II: The Type XXIII submarine was scuttled at Kiel. The wreck was scrapped post-war.
Vs 923	Kriegsmarine	World War II: The KSK-2-class naval drifter/patrol ship was scuttled on this date.
Vs 245 Kriemhild	Kriegsmarine	The Vorpostenboot was lost on this date.
Wega	Kriegsmarine	World War II: Evacuation of East Prussia: The ocean liner was bombed and damaged in the Baltic Sea off Fehmarn by Hawker Typhoon aircraft of 183 Squadron, Royal Air Force. She was set on fire and was beached at the Staberhuk Lighthouse, Fehmarn with the loss of one crew member. The wreck was scrapped in 1948, with the engines being reused in Haukefjell and Kollgrim (both Norway).
Wolfgang L.M. Russ	Germany	World War II: The cargo ship struck a mine and sank off Aarhus, Denmark; or was sunk at Aarhus by de Havilland Mosquito aircraft of 143, 235, 248, 333 and 404 Squadrons, Royal Air Force. Raised and broken up in May 1955.
Yaei Maru No. 2	Japan	World War II: The tanker struck a mine and sank off Singapore.

== 5 May ==
List of shipwrecks: 5 May 1945
Ship	State	Description
Black Point	United States	World War II: The collier was torpedoed and sunk in 85 feet (26 m) of water in the Atlantic Ocean 5 nautical miles (9.3 km; 5.8 mi) east of Point Judith, Rhode Island (41°19′N 71°23′W) by the submarine U-853 (Kriegsmarine) with the loss of 12 of her 46 crew. Survivors were rescued by the steamship Karmen (Yugoslavia), the motor vessel Scandinavia (Sweden) and United States Navy crash boats. Black Point was the last American ship sunk by a Kriegsmarine U-boat.
USS Concrete No. 29	United States Navy	The 366 foot B7-A1 class concrete hulled oil barge was scuttled at position 'Fox West' at Iwo Jima as a breakwater for the Iwo Jima harbor project.
HMT Coriolanus	Royal Navy	World War II: The Shakespearian-class naval trawler (545/770 t, 1941) was mined and sunk in the Adriatic Sea .
Hector	Kriegsmarine	World War II: The fast tug, (a former Type 1937 Schnellboot), was bombed and sunk off "Laland" by Allied aircraft.
K-1	Kriegsmarine	World War II: The gunboat was bombed and sunk by Allied aircraft off Aarhus, Denmark. 63 crew were killed.
HMS ML 558	Royal Navy	World War II: The Fairmile B motor launch (76/86 t, 1943) was mined and sunk in the Adriatic Sea off Novigrad, Yugoslavia .
S-170	Kriegsmarine	World War II: The Type 1939/40 Schnellboot was blown up at Lübeck.
SS-17	Imperial Japanese Navy	World War II: The SS-class landing ship was sunk by US aircraft near Talien.
T36	Kriegsmarine	World War II: The Elbing-class torpedo boat, having been damaged by a mine the previous day, was bombed and sunk by Soviet aircraft off Swinemünde, Pomerania. 63 killed.
T110	Kriegsmarine	World War II: The training ship, a former G-7-class torpedo boat, was scuttled, at Travemunde.
U-17	Kriegsmarine	End of World War II: The Type IIB submarine was scuttled at Wilhelmshaven, Lower Saxony.
U-38	Kriegsmarine	End of World War II: The Type IXA submarine was scuttled west of Wesermünde, Bremen (53°34′N 8°32′E). The wreck was scrapped in 1948.
U-236	Kriegsmarine	End of World War II: The Type VIIC submarine was scuttled off Schleimünde, Schleswig-Holstein.
U-290	Kriegsmarine	End of World War II: The Type VIIC submarine was scuttled in Kupfermühlen Bay.
U-349	Kriegsmarine	End of World War II: The Type VIIC submarine was scuttled in the Geltinger Bucht with the loss of a crew member.
U-351	Kriegsmarine	End of World War II: The Type VIIC submarine was scuttled at Horup Haff (54°53′N 9°50′E). The wreck was raised and scrapped in 1948.
U-370	Kriegsmarine	End of World War II: The Type VIIC submarine was scuttled in the Geltinger Bucht.
U-397	Kriegsmarine	End of World War II: The Type VIIC submarine was scuttled in the Geltinger Bucht.
U-534	Kriegsmarine	World War II: The Type IXC/40 submarine was depth charged and sunk in the Kattegat (56°39′N 11°48′E) by Consolidated B-24 Liberator aircraft of 86 Squadron, Royal Air Force with the loss of three of her 42 crew.
U-579	Kriegsmarine	World War II: The Type VIIC submarine was depth charged and sunk in the Kattegat east of Aarhus, Denmark (56°10′N 11°04′E) by Consolidated B-24 Liberator aircraft of 547 Squadron Royal Air Force with the loss of 24 crew.
U-733	Kriegsmarine	End of World War II: The Type VIIC submarine was scuttled in Flensburg Fjord (54°48′N 9°49′E). The wreck was scrapped in 1948.
U-746	Kriegsmarine	World War II: The Type VIIC submarine was bombed and damaged in the Geltinger Bucht and was consequently scuttled. The wreck was scrapped in 1948.
U-750	Kriegsmarine	End of World War II: The Type VIIC submarine was scuttled in Flensburg Fjord (54°50′N 9°30′E).
U-794	Kriegsmarine	End of World War II: The Type XVIIA submarine was scuttled in the Geltinger Bucht.
U-827	Kriegsmarine	End of World War II: The Type VIIC/41 submarine was scuttled in Flensburg Fjord. The wreck was scrapped in 1948.
U-999	Kriegsmarine	End of World War II: The Type VIIC/41 submarine was scuttled in the Geltinger Bucht.
U-1008	Kriegsmarine	World War II: The Type VIIC/41 submarine was depth charged and damaged in the Kattegat by a Consolidated B-24 Liberator aircraft of 86 Squadron, Royal Air Force with the loss of six of her 50 crew. She was consequently scuttled the next day (56°14′N 10°51′E).
U-1016	Kriegsmarine	End of World War II: The Type VIIC/41 submarine was scuttled in Lübeck Bay.
U-1025	Kriegsmarine	End of World War II: The Type VIIC/41 submarine was scuttled in Flensburger Fjord. The wreck was scrapped post-war.
U-1056	Kriegsmarine	End of World War II: The Type VIIC submarine was scuttled in the Geltinger Bucht.
U-1101	Kriegsmarine	End of World War II: The Type VIIC submarine was scuttled in the Geltinger Bucht. The wreck was scrapped post-war.
U-1162	Kriegsmarine	End of World War II: The Type VIIC submarine was scuttled in the Geltinger Bucht. The wreck was scrapped post-war.
U-1193	Kriegsmarine	End of World War II: The Type VIIC submarine was scuttled in the Geltinger Bucht. The wreck was scrapped post-war.
U-1204	Kriegsmarine	End of World War II: The Type VIIC submarine was scuttled in the Geltinger Bucht. The wreck was scrapped post-war.
U-1207	Kriegsmarine	End of World War II: The Type VIIC submarine was scuttled in the Geltinger Bucht. The wreck was scrapped post-war.
U-1223	Kriegsmarine	End of World War II: The Type IXC/40 submarine was scuttled in the Baltic Sea west of Wesermünde (53°32′N 8°35′E).
U-1234	Kriegsmarine	End of World War II: The Type IXC/40 submarine was scuttled at Hörup, Schleswig-Holstein.
U-1306	Kriegsmarine	End of World War II: The Type VIIC/41 submarine was scuttled in the Geltinger Bucht. The wreck was scrapped post-war.
U-1405	Kriegsmarine	End of World War II: The Type XVIIB submarine was scuttled in Eckernförde Bay. The wreck was scrapped post-war.
U-2333	Kriegsmarine	End of World War II: The Type XXIII submarine was scuttled in the Geltinger Bucht. The wreck was scrapped post-war.
U-2339	Kriegsmarine	End of World War II: The Type XXIII submarine was scuttled in the Geltinger Bucht. The wreck was scrapped post-war.
U-2343	Kriegsmarine	End of World War II: The Type XXIII submarine was scuttled in the Geltinger Bucht. The wreck was scrapped post-war.
U-2346	Kriegsmarine	End of World War II: The Type XXIII submarine was scuttled in the Geltinger Bucht. The wreck was scrapped post-war.
U-2347	Kriegsmarine	End of World War II: The Type XXIII submarine was scuttled in the Geltinger Bucht. The wreck was scrapped post-war.
U-2349	Kriegsmarine	End of World War II: The Type XXIII submarine was scuttled in the Geltinger Bucht. The wreck was scrapped post-war.
U-2352	Kriegsmarine	End of World War II: The Type XXIII submarine was scuttled at Hörup. The wreck was scrapped post-war.
U-2357	Kriegsmarine	End of World War II: The Type XXIII submarine was scuttled in the Geltinger Bucht. The wreck was scrapped post-war.
U-2358	Kriegsmarine	End of World War II: The Type XXIII submarine was scuttled in the Geltinger Bucht. The wreck was scrapped post-war.
U-2360	Kriegsmarine	End of World War II: The Type XXIII submarine was scuttled in the Geltinger Bucht. The wreck was scrapped post-war.
U-2362	Kriegsmarine	End of World War II: The Type XXIII submarine was scuttled in the Geltinger Bucht. The wreck was scrapped post-war.
U-2364	Kriegsmarine	End of World War II: The Type XXIII submarine was scuttled in the Geltinger Bucht. The wreck was scrapped post-war.
U-2366	Kriegsmarine	End of World War II: The Type XXIII submarine was scuttled in the Geltinger Bucht. The wreck was scrapped post-war.
U-2367	Kriegsmarine	The Type XXIII submarine collided with another U-boat in the Geltinger Bucht (approximately 55°00′N 11°00′W) and sank. She was raised in August 1956, repaired and commissioned into the Bundesmarine on 1 October 1957 as U-Hecht.
U-2368	Kriegsmarine	End of World War II: The Type XXIII submarine was scuttled in the Geltinger Bucht. The wreck was scrapped post-war.
U-2369	Kriegsmarine	End of World War II: The Type XXIII submarine was scuttled in the Geltinger Bucht. The wreck was scrapped post-war.
U-2507	Kriegsmarine	End of World War II: The Type XXI submarine was scuttled in the Geltinger Bucht. The wreck was scrapped post-war.
U-2517	Kriegsmarine	End of World War II: The Type XXI submarine was scuttled in the Geltinger Bucht. The wreck was scrapped post-war.
U-2522	Kriegsmarine	End of World War II: The Type XXI submarine was scuttled in the Geltinger Bucht. The wreck was scrapped post-war.
U-2525	Kriegsmarine	End of World War II: The Type XXI submarine was scuttled in the Geltinger Bucht. The wreck was scrapped post-war.
U-2541	Kriegsmarine	End of World War II: The Type XXI submarine was scuttled in the Geltinger Bucht. The wreck was scrapped post-war.
U-2544	Kriegsmarine	End of World War II: The Type XXI submarine was scuttled in the Skagerrak east north east of Aarhus, Denmark (56°06′05″N 10°27′09″E). The wreck was raised in 1952 and scrapped.
U-2551	Kriegsmarine	The Type XXI submarine ran aground in the Baltic Sea off Flensburg (54°49′N 9°28′E). The wreck was blown up by the Royal Navy on 23 July.
U-3015	Kriegsmarine	End of World War II: The Type XXI submarine was scuttled in the Geltinger Bucht. The wreck was scrapped post-war.
U-3022	Kriegsmarine	End of World War II: The Type XXI submarine was scuttled in the Geltinger Bucht. The wreck was scrapped post-war.
U-3044	Kriegsmarine	End of World War II: The Type XXI submarine was scuttled in the Geltinger Bucht. The wreck was scrapped post-war.
U-3501	Kriegsmarine	End of World War II: The Type XXI submarine was scuttled in the Weser Estuary. The wreck was scrapped post-war.
U-3510	Kriegsmarine	End of World War II: The Type XXI submarine was scuttled in the Geltinger Bucht. The wreck was scrapped post-war.
U-3524	Kriegsmarine	End of World War II: The Type XXI submarine was scuttled in the Geltinger Bucht. The wreck was scrapped post-war.
U-3526	Kriegsmarine	End of World War II: The Type XXI submarine was scuttled in the Geltinger Bucht. The wreck was scrapped post-war.
U-3527	Kriegsmarine	End of World War II: The Type XXI submarine was scuttled in the Weser Estuary. The wreck was scrapped post-war.
U-3528	Kriegsmarine	End of World War II: The Type XXI submarine was scuttled in the Weser Estuary. The wreck was scrapped post-war.
U-3529	Kriegsmarine	End of World War II: The Type XXI submarine was scuttled in the Geltinger Bucht. The wreck was scrapped post-war.
U-4701	Kriegsmarine	End of World War II: The Type XXIII submarine was scuttled at Hörup 55°43′00″N 10°10′54″E). The wreck was scrapped post-war.
U-4702	Kriegsmarine	End of World War II: The Type XXIII submarine was scuttled in the Geltinger Bucht 55°48′N 9°49′E). The wreck was scrapped post-war.
U-4703	Kriegsmarine	End of World War II: The Type XXIII submarine was scuttled in the Geltinger Bucht. The wreck was scrapped post-war.
U-4704	Kriegsmarine	End of World War II: The Type XXIII submarine was scuttled at Hörup (54°54′N 9°50′E). The wreck was scrapped post-war.
U-4707	Kriegsmarine	End of World War II: The Type XXIII submarine was scuttled in the Geltinger Bucht. The wreck was scrapped post-war.
U-4710	Kriegsmarine	End of World War II: The Type XXIII submarine was scuttled in the Geltinger Bucht. The wreck was scrapped post-war.
UJ 322	Kriegsmarine	World War II: The KSK-2-class naval drifter/submarine chaser was scuttled on this date.
W-20	Imperial Japanese Navy	World War II: The No.19-class minesweeper was torpedoed and sunk in the Yellow Sea by USS Trepang (United States Navy).

== 6 May ==
List of shipwrecks: 6 May 1945
Ship	State	Description
AT 916	Kriegsmarine	World War II: The Artilleriefährprahm was sunk by American tanks on the Danube, km 2086.
AT 917	Kriegsmarine	World War II: The Artilleriefährprahm was sunk by American tanks on the Danube, km 2091.
Kinrei Maru	Japan	World War II: The cargo ship was torpedoed and sunk in the Bay of Thailand by USS Hammerhead (United States Navy). 18 crewmen and two gunners were killed.
MO-595	Soviet Navy	World War II: The PP-19-OK-class motor antisubmarine boat was shelled and sunk by T28 (Kriegsmarine). 12 crewmen were killed, 8 were captured the next day.
Oder	Kriegsmarine	World War II: The auxiliary river minesweeper was sunk by American tanks on the Danube, km 2107.
PiLB 43/I	Kriegsmarine	World War II: The PiLB 43 type landing craft was sunk by Soviet aircraft.
S-226	Kriegsmarine	World War II: The Schnellboot was scuttled after being heavily damaged in a Soviet air attack.
U-853	Kriegsmarine	World War II: The Type IXC/40 submarine was depth charged, hedgehogged and sunk in the Atlantic Ocean off Point Judith, Rhode Island, United States (41°13′N 71°27′W) by USS Atherton and USS Moberly (both United States Navy) with the loss of all 55 crew.
U-881	Kriegsmarine	World War II: The Type IXC/40 submarine was depth charged and sunk in the Atlantic Ocean (43°18′N 47°44′W) by USS Farquhar (United States Navy) with the loss of all 54 crew.
U-3523	Kriegsmarine	World War II: The Type XXI submarine was depth charged and sunk in the Skagerrak (57°52′N 10°49′E) by a Consolidated B-24 Liberator aircraft on 86 Squadron, Royal Air Force with the loss of all 58 crew. Wreck located in 2018 approximately 9 nautical miles (17 km) from reported sunk position.

== 7 May ==
List of shipwrecks: 7 May 1945
Ship	State	Description
Asuka	Imperial Japanese Navy	World War II: The depot ship was sunk by United States aircraft in the Whangpoo River in China.
Avondale Park	United Kingdom	World War II: Convoy EN 491: The cargo ship (2,878 GRT, 1944) was torpedoed and sunk in the North Sea (56°05′N 2°32′W) by U-2336 (Kriegsmarine) with the loss of two of her 38 crew.
Kashima Maru	Japan	World War II: The cargo ship struck a mine and was beached in the Kanmon Strait (33°54′N 130°52′E).
M-22	Kriegsmarine	World War II: The M-class minesweeper was scuttled off Kiel, Schleswig-Holstein.
M 4622 Anna Busse	Kriegsmarine	The auxiliary minesweeper was lost on this date.
HNoMS NYMS 382	Royal Norwegian Navy	World War II: The YMS-1-class minesweeper was torpedoed and sunk off Lyme Bay by U-1023. Twenty-two crewmen were killed; the ten survivors were rescued by HNoMS NYMS 379, HNoMS NYMS 380 and HNoMS NYMS 381 (all Royal Norwegian Navy).
S 191 and S 301	Kriegsmarine	The Type 1939/40 Schnellboots sank each other in a collision in Fehmarnsund.
Sneland I	Norway	World War II: Convoy EN 491: The cargo ship was torpedoed and sunk in the North Sea (56°09′36″N 2°31′24″W) by U-2336 (Kriegsmarine) with the loss of seven of her 29 crew. Survivors were rescued by HMT Leicester City and HMT Valse (both Royal Navy).
Teika Maru	Japan	World War II: The cargo ship struck a mine and was run aground west of Shimonoseki, Japan (34°06′N 130°47′E). Three crewmen were killed.
U-1406	Kriegsmarine	End of World War II: The Type XVIIB submarine was scuttled at Cuxhaven, Lower Saxony. The wreck was later raised and used by the United States Navy. Scrapped in 1948.
U-1407	Kriegsmarine	End of World War II: The Type XVIIC submarine was scuttled at Cuxhaven. She was salvaged by the Royal Navy, repaired and entered service as HMS Meteorite. Scrapped in September 1949.
V 603 Carsten	Kriegsmarine	The Vorpostenboot was lost on this date.
W-29	Imperial Japanese Navy	World War II: The No.19-class minesweeper was mined and sunk in the Kanmon Strait (34°02′N 130°54′E). Forty-three crewmen were listed as missing.
Zell	Kriegsmarine	The auxiliary river minesweeper was sunk on this date.

== 8 May ==
List of shipwrecks: 8 May 1945
Ship	State	Description
Daito Maru No. 3	Japan	World War II: The fishing vessel was torpedoed and sunk in the Pacific Ocean off Honshu by USS Bowfin (United States Navy).
F 1040	Kriegsmarine	World War II: The incomplete Type D Marinefahrprahm was sunk at an unknown shipyard.
F 1229	Kriegsmarine	The Type D Marinefahrprahm was sunk on this date.
F 1230	Kriegsmarine	The Type D Marinefahrprahm was sunk on this date.
Horace Binney	United States	World War II: The Liberty ship struck a mine in the North Sea off Vlissingen, Zeeland, Netherlands. She was beached at Deal, Kent, United Kingdom but broke in two. Declared a total loss.
Kotobuki Maru	Japan	World War II: The passenger ship struck a mine and sank in the South China Sea (24°30′N 126°30′E). She was refloated in January 1949 and scrapped in 1951.
KT-696	Soviet Navy	The K-18-class river minesweeping launch was sunk on this date.
R-88	Kriegsmarine	World War II: The Type R-41 minesweeper was scuttled at Kiel, Schleswig-Holstein.
Sperrbrecher 173	Kriegsmarine	World War II: The Sperrbrecher was sunk while still under conversion from a cargo ship.
U-37	Kriegsmarine	End of World War II: The Type IXA submarine was scuttled in Sonderberg Bay (54°55′N 9°47′E). The wreck was later scrapped.
U-320	Kriegsmarine	World War II: The Type VIIC/41 submarine was depth charged and damaged in the North Sea off Bergen, Norway (61°32′N 1°53′E) by a Consolidated PBY Catalina aircraft of 210 Squadron, Royal Air Force. She was consequently scuttled off Sotre Island.
U-382	Kriegsmarine	End of World War II: The Type VIIC submarine was scuttled at Wilhelmshaven, Lower Saxony.
U-2365	Kriegsmarine	End of World War II: The Type XXIII submarine was scuttled in the Kattegat north west of Anholt Island, Denmark (56°51′N 11°49′E). She was raised in June 1956, repaired and commissioned into the Bundesmarine as U-Hai on 15 August 1957.
U-2538	Kriegsmarine	End of World War II: The Type XXI submarine was scuttled off Ærø, Denmark (54°53′05″N 10°15′07″E). The wreck was scrapped in 1950.
U-3030	Kriegsmarine	End of World War II: The Type XXI submarine was scuttled in Eckernförde Bay (54°30′48″N 10°06′12″E).
U-3503	Kriegsmarine	End of World War II: The Type XXI submarine was scuttled in the Kattegat west of Gothenburg, Sweden (57°39′N 11°44′E). The wreck was raised in 1946 and scrapped.

== 9 May ==
List of shipwrecks: 9 May 1945
Ship	State	Description
Artyomovets TK-132	Soviet Navy	The Odesskiy Patriot TK-7-class motor torpedo boat was lost on this date.
Dainan Maru	Imperial Japanese Navy	World War II: The Standard Type 2A-class tanker (a.k.a. Okusu Maru) was damaged off Koro Jima by United States Navy aircraft on 5 May. The vessel was beached northeast of Kona on Koratsu on 9 May.
F 517	Kriegsmarine	World War II: The Type C Marinefahrprahm was torpedoed and sunk in the Baltic Sea by Soviet Douglas A-20 Havoc aircraft.
Liselotte Fridrich	Nazi Germany	World War II: The cargo ship was torpedoed and sunk in the Baltic Sea by Soviet Douglas A-20 Havoc aircraft. 300 people were killed.
HMS ML 591	Royal Navy	The Fairmile B motor launch (76/86 t, 1944) sank in the Sittaung River, Burma.
HMS ML 905	Royal Navy	The Fairmile B motor launch (76/86 t, 1944) sank in the Sittaung River, Burma.
Odesskiy Komsomolets TK-141	Soviet Navy	World War II: The Odesskiy Patriot TK-7-class motor torpedo boat was sunk by a Soviet Air Force Lavochkin La-5 aircraft off Libau. Two crewmen were wounded.
HMS Prompt	Royal Navy	World War II: The Algerine-class minesweeper struck a mine in the North Sea off Ostend, West Flanders, Belgium and was damaged. She was declared a constructive total loss.
Strelnieks	Germany	World War II: The tug was shelled, captured and scuttled off Gotland, Sweden by Soviet Navy vessels. Three tugs, two schooners and a barge were also scuttled by the Soviets.
Unknown	Germany	World War II: A tug, a barge and two schooners were sunk with depth charges when they refused to surrender to SK-175 and MO-543 (both Soviet Navy).
Unknown	Germany	World War II: Two motorboats were captured by TK-115 (Soviet Navy). Prisoners of war were removed and the boats were abandoned to sink.

== 10 May ==
List of shipwrecks: 10 May 1945
Ship	State	Description
Carl Peters	Kriegsmarine	World War II: The E-boat support ship struck a mine and sank off Geltinger Bucht, Germany.
USS Concrete No. 6	United States Navy	The 366 foot B7-A1 class concrete hulled oil barge was scuttled at position 'George West' at Iwo Jima as a breakwater for the Iwo Jima harbor project.
MNL 22	Kriegsmarine	World War II: The MNL I type self propelled landing barge was surrendered in early May and foundered on 10 May.
Tatuwa Maru	Imperial Japanese Navy	World War II: The Tatsuwa Maru-class auxiliary transport struck a mine and sank off Shimonoseki (34°05′N 132°27′E). Raised in 1946 and repaired by 1949 and put in commercial service.

== 11 May ==
List of shipwrecks: 11 May 1945
Ship	State	Description
Aitoku Maru	Japan	World War II: The transport was bombed and sunk in Kataoka Bay, Shimushu Ialand by Consolidated B-24 Liberator aircraft of the United States Eleventh Air Force.
FS-255	United States Army	World War II: The Design 381 coastal freighter was torpedoed and sunk just after midnight while anchored off Tolomo Port, Tolomo Bay, Davao Gulf, Philippines. Four crewmen from the United States Coast Guard were killed. The survivors were rescued by USS LCI-21 (United States Navy).

== 12 May ==
List of shipwrecks: 12 May 1945
Ship	State	Description
Chile Maru	Japan	World War II: The cargo ship was bombed and sunk in the South China Sea (34°25′N 129°40′E) by United States Navy aircraft.
MGB 2002	Royal Navy	World War II: The motor torpedo boat (87/103 t, 1943) struck a mine and sank in the Skaggerak. 24 of the 26 crew and all 4 passengers were killed.
Rekizan Maru	Japan	World War II: The cargo ship was torpedoed and sunk in the East China Sea by USS Raton (United States Navy).

== 13 May ==
List of shipwrecks: 13 May 1945
Ship	State	Description
Gyoryu Maru	Japan	World War II: The freighter struck a mine and sank off Kobe (34°40′N 135°10′E. She was refloated in January 1947 and beached at Kobe. Subsequently scrapped.
Nisshin Maru	Imperial Japanese Navy	World War II: The auxiliary gunboat was torpedoed and sunk off the Kuril Islands by USS Plaice (United States Navy).
Shinnan Maru	Japan	World War II: The cargo ship was torpedoed and sunk in the Pacific Ocean off Todozaki, Honshu (39°06′N 141°57′E) by USS Cero (United States Navy).
Shosei Maru No. 15	Imperial Japanese Navy	World War II: The guard boat was torpedoed and sunk in the Java Sea by HMS Trump (Royal Navy).
Steiner	Norway	World War II: The coaster struck a mine and sank in Sognefjord, Norway with the loss of a crew member.
Yosei Maru	Imperial Japanese Navy	World War II: The Yosei Maru-class oiler was torpedoed and sunk in the Java Sea (06°31′S 111°19′E) by USS Baya (United States Navy). 16 crewmen were killed .

== 14 May ==
List of shipwrecks: 14 May 1945
Ship	State	Description
Baikal Maru	Imperial Japanese Army	The hospital ship ran aground off Himeshima. Refloated and repaired sometime in 1945 and put in commercial service post-war.
Dai Maru	Japan	World War II: The cargo ship was bombed and sunk by Allied aircraft off Makassar, Netherlands East Indies.
TFA 4	Kriegsmarine	World War II: The torpedo recovery vessel, a former Dragen-class torpedo boat, struck a mine and sank in the Geltinger Bucht.
Yoshino Maru	Imperial Japanese Navy	World War II: The auxiliary minesweeper was torpedoed and sunk in the Pacific Ocean south of Honshu by USS Sand Lance (United States Navy).

== 15 May ==
List of shipwrecks: 15 May 1945
Ship	State	Description
Fukuun Maru	Japan	World War II: The boat was sunk off the Kuril Islands by USS Sea Poacher (United States Navy).
Tottori Maru	Imperial Japanese Navy	World War II: The Tokoshima Maru-class auxiliary transport was torpedoed and sunk in 75 metres (246 ft) of water in the Gulf of Thailand (09°58′N 101°05′E) by USS Hammerhead (United States Navy). Her captain and fifty-two crewmen were killed. Nineteen survivors were rescued by Hatsutaka (Imperial Japanese Navy).
Ume Maru No. 56	Japan	World War II: The lightship was torpedoed and sunk off the Kuril Islands by USS Sea Poacher (United States Navy).

== 16 May ==
List of shipwrecks: 16 May 1945
Ship	State	Description
Eiju Maru	Japan	World War II: The cargo ship was torpedoed and sunk in the Yellow Sea by USS Raton (United States Navy).
Haguro	Imperial Japanese Navy	World War II: Battle of the Malacca Strait: The Myōkō-class cruiser was torpedoed, shelled and sunk in the Malacca Strait 55 nautical miles (102 km; 63 mi) off Penang, Malaya (04°49′N 99°42′E) by Royal Navy destroyers with the loss of 751 men killed including Vice Admiral Hashimoto and Rear Admiral Sugiura. 320 survivors were rescued by Kamikaze (Imperial Japanese Navy). On 23 May 2014 Hai Wei Gong 889 (Cambodia) was detained by Malaysian authorities for illegally salvaging her wreck.
Hatsutaka	Imperial Japanese Navy	World War II: The Hatsutaka-class minelayer was torpedoed and sunk in the Gulf of Thailand (04°49′N 103°31′E) by USS Hawkbill (United States Navy). She sank one-half mile (0.80 km) offshore, survivors refused rescue by USS Hawkbill and an unknown number of survivors, including her captain, swam to shore. 70 crew were killed.
T-19	Imperial Japanese Navy	World War II: The No.1-class landing ship ran aground in Sukumo Bay. She was refloated and arrived at Hirao Naval Base in the Inland Sea on 22 May.
U-287	Kriegsmarine	World War II: The Type VIIC submarine was scuttled by her crew in the Elbe Estuary (53°50′N 8°50′E). All 44 crew survived and claimed they struck a mine.

== 17 May ==
List of shipwrecks: 17 May 1945
Ship	State	Description
Chosan Maru	Japan	World War II: The cargo ship was torpedoed and sunk in the Yellow Sea or East China Sea by USS Shad (United States Navy).
USS Concrete No. 11	United States Navy	The 366 foot B7-A1 class concrete hulled oil barge was scuttled at position 'How West' at Iwo Jima as a breakwater for the Iwo Jima harbor project.
Koan Maru	Japan	World War II: The cargo ship struck a mine and sank in the South China Sea (34°38′N 135°11′E).
Tairyu Maru	Imperial Japanese Navy	World War II: The Peacetime Standard Type D auxiliary transport (1,913 GRT 1940) was sunk in the Inland Sea of Japan 3 nautical miles (5.6 km) south east of the Wada-misaki Lighthouse, in shallow waters near Kobe (34°36′N 135°13′E) by a mine with the loss of one live. Raised post War, repaired and returned to commercial service.

== 18 May ==
List of shipwrecks: 18 May 1945
Ship	State	Description
Cha-57	Imperial Japanese Navy	World War II: The auxiliary submarine chaser struck a mine and sank off Penang, Malaya.
Enkyo Maru	Japan	World War II: The government owned cargo ship was bombed, strafed, and sunk off Saishu-To, Chōsen, Korea (33°14′N 120°50′E) by Consolidated PB4Y Liberator aircraft of the United States Navy. Twenty-four crew members were lost; 2,400 passengers were rescued by CD-81 (Imperial Japanese Navy).
USS Longshaw	United States Navy	World War II: The Fletcher-class destroyer ran aground off Naha, Okinawa, Japan. She was shelled and damaged by Japanese shore-based artillery and was abandoned with the loss of 86 of her 273 crew. She was later scuttled by United States Navy warships.
USS LST-808	United States Navy	World War II: The LST-1-class tank landing ship was torpedoed by a Japanese aircraft off Ie-jima and was run aground to avoid sinking. The crew lost five killed and five wounded while five men of Boat Pool Able aboard were also killed and seven wounded, with one dying of his wounds the next day. The wreck was set afire by a kamikaze two days later, abandoned and finally destroyed on 11 November 1945.
Sperrbrecher 23 Reyniersz	Kriegsmarine	World War II: The Sperrbrecher struck a mine and sank in Kiel Bay. She was refloated in 1951 and scrapped in 1952.
No. 28	Imperial Japanese Navy	The H-35-class motor gunboat was lost on this date.
Unknown coastal trading ship	Japan	World War II: The coaster was torpedoed and sunk off Ulee Lhoe, Sumatra, Netherlands East Indies by HMS Seadog (Royal Navy).

== 19 May ==
List of shipwrecks: 19 May 1945
Ship	State	Description
Daishin Maru	Japan	The cargo ship was sunk in the western half of the Tsushima Strait in a collision with Kashima (Imperial Japanese Navy).
HNoMS MTB-715	Royal Norwegian Navy	World War II: The Fairmile D motor torpedo boat was destroyed by an explosion at Fosnavåg, Norway.

== 20 May ==
List of shipwrecks: 20 May 1945
Ship	State	Description
CHa-244	Imperial Japanese Navy	World War II: The CHa-1-class auxiliary submarine chaser was sunk south of Okinawa by American aircraft.
USS Chase	United States Navy	World War II: The Buckley-class destroyer escort was severely damaged by a kamikaze attack off Okinawa. 35 crew were wounded but no one was killed. She was consequently decommissioned and scrapped.
Seki Maru No. 5	Japan	World War II: The merchant whaler was sunk in the Pacific Ocean east-south-east of Kinkazan, Honshu, Japan (38°06′N 142°24′E) by USS Cero (United States Navy).
SS-20	Imperial Japanese Navy	The SS-class landing ship was run aground and sank near Shodoshima. The ship was raised on 17 September 1945, but sunk again in a storm while under repair (location unknown), raised, repaired and put in commercial service.
USS Thatcher	United States Navy	World War II: The Fletcher-class destroyer was severely damaged by a kamikaze attack off Okinawa with the loss of fourteen of her crew. She was consequently decommissioned and scrapped.
U-963	Kriegsmarine	End of World War II: The Type VIIC submarine was scuttled off Nazaré, Portugal (39°36′N 9°05′W). All 48 crew survived.
Unknown sailing vessel	unknown	World War II: The sailing vessel was shelled and sunk off Sigli, Sumatra, Netherlands East Indies by HMS Seadog (Royal Navy).

== 21 May ==
List of shipwrecks: 21 May 1945
Ship	State	Description
Kunikawa Maru	Imperial Japanese Navy	World War II: The Kamikawa Maru-class auxiliary transport was bombed and sunk at Balikpapan (02°15′S 116°00′E). Eight sailors were killed.
W-34	Imperial Japanese Navy	World War II: The No.19-class minesweeper was torpedoed and sunk in the Java Sea off Kepulauan, Netherlands East Indies (06°18′S 116°14′E) by USS Chub (United States Navy). Seventy-eight survivors were rescued; twenty crewmen were killed. There were 25 wounded and two reported missing.

== 22 May ==
List of shipwrecks: 22 May 1945
Ship	State	Description
CH-37	Imperial Japanese Navy	World War II: The No.13-class submarine chaser was sunk in the East China Sea west of the Satsunan Islands (29°45′N 129°10′E) by aircraft based on USS Bennington and USS Hornet (both United States Navy)
CH-58	Imperial Japanese Navy	World War II: The No.13-class submarine chaser was sunk in the East China Sea west of the Satsunan Islands (29°45′N 129°10′E) by aircraft based on USS Bennington and USS Hornet (both United States Navy).
T-173	Imperial Japanese Navy	World War II: The No.101-class landing ship was sunk in the East China Sea west of the Satsunan Islands (29°45′N 129°10′E) by aircraft based on USS Bennington and USS Hornet (both United States Navy).

== 24 May ==
List of shipwrecks: 24 May 1945
Ship	State	Description
Kiyokawa Maru	Imperial Japanese Navy	World War II: The transport ship struck a mine in the South China Sea (32°44′N 129°52′E) and was severely damaged.
HM MGB 2007	Royal Navy	The motor gun boat (87/103 t, 1943) was wrecked off Aberdeen, Scotland.
U-979	Kriegsmarine	End of World War II: The Type VIIC submarine ran aground and was scuttled at Amrum, Schleswig-Holstein (54°38′N 8°23′E).

== 25 May ==
List of shipwrecks: 25 May 1945
Ship	State	Description
USS Bates	United States Navy	World War II: The high-speed transport, a former Buckley-class destroyer escort, was sunk in the Pacific Ocean two nautical miles (3.7 km; 2.3 mi) south of Ie-jima by three kamikaze aircraft with the loss of 21 of her 213 crew.
Brazil Maru	Imperial Japanese Army	World War II: The Daifuku Maru No. 1-class transport was sunk in the Inland Sea of Japan 1.5 nautical miles (2.8 km; 1.7 mi) off the Wada-misaki Lighthouse, near Kobe (34°40′N 135°12′E) by a mine.
Dainan Maru	Imperial Japanese Navy	World War II: The Standard Type 2A-class tanker (a.k.a. Okusu Maru) was damaged off Koro Jima by United States Navy aircraft on 5 May. The vessel was beached northeast of Kona on Koratsu on 9 May.
Kairyu Maru	Imperial Japanese Navy	World War II: The guard boat was torpedoed and sunk in the Sunda Sea by USS Chub (United States Navy).
USS LSM-135	United States Navy	World War II: The LSM-1-class landing ship medium was sunk in the Pacific Ocean off the Ryukyu Islands by a kamikaze aircraft. Eleven survivors were rescued by USS Fleming (United States Navy).
Nittei Maru	Japan	World War II: The cargo ship (1,000 GRT) was sunk off Borneo by HMS Thorough (Royal Navy).
Shinto Maru	Japan	World War II: The cargo ship was torpedoed and sunk in the Java Sea by HMS Trenchant (Royal Navy). Later salvaged and returned to service.
Toryu Maru	Japan	World War II: Convoy SE-3: The cargo ship was torpedoed and sunk in the East China Sea by USS Raton (United States Navy).
Wa-105	Imperial Japanese Navy	World War II: The Djember-class minesweeper was torpedoed and sunk in the Java Sea (06°21′S 110°57′E) by HMS Trenchant (Royal Navy).
Yoshitomo Maru No. 12 Go	Imperial Japanese Navy	The auxiliary minesweeper was lost on this date.

== 26 May ==
List of shipwrecks: 26 May 1945
Ship	State	Description
CHa-172	Imperial Japanese Navy	World War II: The CHa-1-class auxiliary submarine chaser was sunk off Fushiki by mines.
Kotobuki Maru No. 7	Japan	World War II: The cargo ship was torpedoed and sunk in the East China Sea by USS Billfish (United States Navy).

== 27 May ==
List of shipwrecks: 27 May 1945
Ship	State	Description
Caliche	United States	The 4,936-ton tanker was scuttled at position 'Mike South' at Iwo Jima as a breakwater for the Iwo Jima harbor project.
Chilkoot	United States	The 14-gross register ton, 51-foot (15.5 m) motor cargo vessel was wrecked on the coast of Guide Island (57°08′00″N 135°31′10″W) in Southeast Alaska, 10 nautical miles (19 km) northwest of Sitka, Territory of Alaska.
Kinei Maru	Japan	World War II: The coaster was torpedoed and sunk in the Pacific Ocean south of Honshu by USS Tench (United States Navy).
Misago Maru No. 3 Go	Imperial Japanese Navy	The auxiliary minesweeper was lost on this date.
Stork	United States	The 17-gross register ton, 44.6-foot (13.6 m) motor towing vessel sank off Sanak Island in the Fox Islands in the eastern Aleutian Islands.
Yawata Maru No. 3	Imperial Japanese Navy	World War II: The guard boat was sunk in the Pacific Ocean north of the Bonin Islands by USS Tigrone (United States Navy).

== 28 May ==
List of shipwrecks: 28 May 1945
Ship	State	Description
Biko Maru	Japan	World War II: The sailing vessel was sunk in the Yellow Sea by USS Ray (United States Navy).
USS Drexler	United States Navy	World War II: The Allen M. Sumner-class destroyer was sunk in the Pacific Ocean off Okinawa, Japan (27°06′N 127°38′E) by two kamikaze aircraft with the loss of 158 of her 336 crew.

== 29 May ==
List of shipwrecks: 29 May 1945
Ship	State	Description
HMS LCT 357	Royal Navy	The Mk 6 landing craft tank (350/625 t, 1942) was sunk by an explosion at Suda Bay, Crete.
Kuretake Maru	Japan	World War II: Chi Convoy: The cargo ship was torpedoed and damaged in the Sea of Okhotsk east of Sakhalin (46°36′N 144°22′E) by USS Sterlet (United States Navy). She sank the next day. A total of 272 troops and six crewmen were killed. Four hundred survivors were rescued by Shimushu (Imperial Japanese Navy).
HMS LCP(L) 344	Royal Navy	The landing craft personnel (large) (5.9/8.2 t, 1943) was lost at Akyab, Burma.
HMS LCP(L) 378	Royal Navy	The landing craft personnel (large) (5.9/8.2 t, 1943) was lost on this date.
Mars	Netherlands	World War II: The cargo ship was sunk by a mine off Araxos, Greece. Five crewmen were lost.
Tenryo Maru	Japan	World War II: Chi Convoy: The cargo ship was torpedoed and sunk in the Pacific Ocean by USS Sterlet (United States Navy). Seven hundred and seventy-three men of the 23rd Air Defence Battalion, 26 gunners and 83 crewmen were killed.
Tsuruga Maru	Japan	World War II: The cargo ship struck a mine and sank off Niigata.

== 30 May ==
List of shipwrecks: 30 May 1945
Ship	State	Description
Hokoku Maru	Japan	World War II: The cargo ship was torpedoed and sunk in the Sunda Sea by USS Blenny (United States Navy).
Hyuga Maru	Imperial Japanese Army	World War II: The Kibitsu Maru-class landing craft depot ship struck a mine off Hakata, about 3.6 kilometres (2.2 mi) south south east of Genka Jima and was beached. Later, she was deemed a constructive total loss.
Sinno Maru	Japan	World War II: The cargo ship struck a mine north of Tsuruga Bay and was severely damaged. She was consequently scrapped.
Two large Daihatsu landing craft	Imperial Japanese Navy	World War II: The two large Daihatsu landing craft, apparently from the sunk transport Kuretake Maru, flooded and sank while under tow by Shimushu (Imperial Japanese Navy) between Paramushiro, Kuriles and Otaru, Hokkaido.

== 31 May ==
List of shipwrecks: 31 May 1945
Ship	State	Description
Hebrides	United Kingdom	The cargo ship (585 GRT, 1898) was beached in Gunna Sound, Inner Hebrides.
I-361	Imperial Japanese Navy	World War II: The I-361-class submarine was torpedoed and sunk in the Pacific Ocean 400 nautical miles (740 km) south east of Okinawa (20°22′N 134°09′E) by a Grumman TBM Avenger aircraft based on USS Anzio (United States Navy). Seventy-six crewmen and five Kaiten pilots were killed.
Uzbekistan	Soviet Union	The cargo ship collided with American Star (United States) in Dutch Harbor, Alaska Territory, United States and was beached to avoid sinking.

== Unknown date ==
List of shipwrecks: Unknown date 1945
Ship	State	Description
DB 55 Mewa VII	Kriegsmarine	The naval trawler was lost sometime in May.
F 873	Kriegsmarine	World War II: The Type D Marinefahrprahm was sunk by Soviet Douglas A-20 Havoc aircraft on the Renoy River on 9 May, or on 25 April 1945 by Soviet aircraft.
F 1028	Kriegsmarine	The Type D Marinefahrprahm was scuttled in Korneuburg, on the Danube, sometime in May.
F 1031	Kriegsmarine	The Type D Marinefahrprahm was sunk sometime in May.
F 1031	Kriegsmarine	World War II: The incomplete Type D Marinefahrprahm was sunk at Erste Donau Shipyard, Korneuburg.
F 1032	Kriegsmarine	World War II: The incomplete Type D Marinefahrprahm was sunk at Erste Donau Shipyard, Korneuburg.
F 1159	Kriegsmarine	World War II: The Type D Marinefahrprahm was surrendered in early May and wrecked sometime later in May.
FR 5	Kriegsmarine	The FR 1-class river minesweeper was lost sometime in May.
FR 8	Kriegsmarine	The FR 7-class river minesweeper was lost sometime in May.
H26 Herta Engeline Fritzen	Kriegsmarine	World War II: The transport ship was sunk at Brunsbüttel. She was raised post-war, and entered Belgian service in January 1949.
Helios	Germany	World War II: The cargo ship was severely damaged in an Allied air raid on Flensburg. She was consequently scrapped in 1948.
Kehrwieder	Kriegsmarine	World War II: The minelayer, a former M 1915-class minesweeper, was bombed and sunk by Allied aircraft at La Spezia, Liguria, Italy.
LAT 30 Prinses Beatrix	Kriegsmarine	World War II: The light gun carrier/landing fire support ship was sunk on 14 April, or sunk on 8 May by Soviet aircraft in the Baltic Sea.
HMS LCP 110 and HMS LCP 1121	Royal Navy	The landing craft personnels were lost sometime in May.
M-18	Kriegsmarine	World War II: The M-class minesweeper was scuttled at Kiel, Schleswig-Holstein, sometime in May. Later scrapped.
Mar del Plata	Germany	World War II: The transport ship struck a mine off Aarhus, Denmark and was damaged. Subsequently repaired and returned to service.
Petropolis	Allied-occupied Germany	World War II: The cargo ship was beached on the Juelsand, in the Elbe. She was damaged in a gale on 29 May and was declared a total loss. The wreck was scrapped in 1946.
Phœnicia	Germany	World War II: The cargo ship was scuttled at Kiel. She was refloated, repaired and entered Soviet service in 1946 as Admiral Senyavin.
Nymphe	Kriegsmarine	World War II: The flak ship was damaged by British aircraft and beached at Solvær, Norway. Later refloated and returned to the Royal Norwegian Navy later in the year and was broken up.
Samlistar	United Kingdom	The cargo ship (7,210 GRT, 1944) ran aground off Quebec, Canada. Refloated and arrived at Quebec City on 31 May.
SA 5 and SA 6	Kriegsmarine	World War II: The MS 11-class MS boats were reported scuttled at Alto Tirino, Abruzzo, Italy sometime in May.
SAT 16 West Flandern	Kriegsmarine	World War II: The heavy gun carrier/landing fire support ship was sunk on 1 May, or sunk on 8 May by Soviet aircraft in the Baltic Sea.
SG 22	Kriegsmarine	World War II: The escort ship, a former Elan-class corvette, was scuttled at Livorno, Italy.
Tsuki Maru	Japan	World War II: The sailing vessel was sunk in the East China Sea or Yellow Sea by USS Ray (United States Navy) between 19 and 30 May.
UJ 315	Kriegsmarine	World War II: The KSK-2-class naval drifter/submarine chaser was scuttled in May. Raised and repaired by the post War Occupation Government and awarded to the United Kingdom as a war reparation in 1947.
V 1816 Dauphin	Kriegsmarine	The naval trawler/Vorpostenboot was lost sometime in May.
Vs 144 Excelsior III	Kriegsmarine	The Vorpostensicherungsboot was lost sometime in May.
Vs 166	Kriegsmarine	World War II: The KSK-2-class naval drifter/patrol ship was scuttled in May.
USS YO-156 and USS YO-157	United States Navy	The self-propelled fuel oil barges were lost at Sitka, Alaska sometime in May.
