= Martin Nordenström =

Swedish fencer

Personal information
- Full name: Sven Alvar Martin Nordenström
- Born: 9 December 1888 Stockholm, Sweden
- Died: 2 May 1945 (aged 56)

Sport
- Sport: Fencing

Martin Nordenström (9 December 1888 – 2 May 1945) was a Swedish fencer. He competed in the individual sabre event at the 1912 Summer Olympics. He died aboard the ferry Spercheios when it capsized off the coast of Cape Zourva, Greece.

== See also ==
- List of shipwrecks in May 1945 § 2 May
