= Operation Judgement =

Operation Judgement may refer to:

- Operation Judgement (1916), (Unternehmen Gericht), a German offensive during the Battle of Verdun
- Operation Judgement (1940), A British naval air attack on the Italian battle fleet in Taranto harbour; the Battle of Taranto.
- Operation Judgement (1945), a British naval attack on a German U-boat base at Kilbotn, Norway
