= Lumbwa people =

The Lumbwa (also Lumbua, Umpua, Humba and Wakwavi) were a pastoral community which inhabited southern Kenya and northern Tanzania. The term Lumbwa has variously referred to a Kalenjin-speaking community, portions of the Maa-speaking Loikop communities since (at least) the mid-19th century, and to the Kalenjin-speaking Kipsigis community for much of the late 19th to mid-20th centuries.

By the late-19th century, the term as an identity was largely out of use, but had taken on pejorative connotations of those who had abandoned pastoralism and war culture in exchange for agricultural lifestyle.

== Sources and historiography ==
The journals, letters and published articles of the first three missionaries of the Church Missionary Society in East Africa (Johann Ludwig Krapf, Johannes Rebmann and Jakob Erhardt), written during the 1840s and 1850s, contain the earliest references to the Lumbwa;

Krapf arrived on the East African coast in December 1843, and made his first trip into the interior in January 1844. He encountered reports of the nearby "Okooafee" and their southern neighbors, the "Quapee". Krapf deduced within a year that the two groups were the same people, and he began referring to them as Wakuafi in his writings. In 1852, he learned that the Wakuafi referred to themselves as Iloikop. At this time, The Swahili name Wakuafi was used to describe all Iloikop peoples, although it was later narrowed to represent only the non-Maasai Iloikop. It is suggested that the term Humba (or Lumbwa) was a Bantu word used by the Bantu of the interior to refer to the same group of pastoralists.

Accounts by missionaries and explorers during the 1870s and 1880s generally agreed with those of early missionaries, with distinctions among the Maasai, Wakwavi and Lumbwa beginning to appear. In an early account, Thomas Wakefield described the "poor Wakwavi ... [who,] having long since been robbed of their cattle by the Maasai, were compelled to turn their attention to agricultural pursuits". Charles New concurred in 1873 with his predecessors' assertion that the Maasai and "Wakuavi" called themselves Orloikob, which he translated as "possessors of the soil"; both groups were pastoralists. James Last (who was stationed at Mamboia in central Tanzania during the 1880s) concluded – like Krapf – that "Humba" was an equivalent term for "Kwavi", and both peoples were pastoralists.

By the early 20th century, Maasai identity was distinct from that of the Wakwavi. The latter term being used to refer to non-Maasai Loikop. The term Lumbwa was by then primarily used to refer to the Kipsigis sections of the Kalenjin though it still appeared to have multiple connotations.

A. C. Hollis, writing about the Maasai in 1905, identifies two divisions: those living in British territory and "who called themselves Il-Maasae", and others "... who were called 'L-Oikop or Il-Lumbwa, [who] lived in German East Africa" as farmers. In his account of the Nandi also published in 1905, he notes extensively that the Nandi referred to the Kipsigis as Lumbwa.

== Etymology ==
In Maasai the term Ilumbwa means 'well-diggers'. Within the Maasai pastoral culture of the 19th century, the term Lumbwa and other related terms would acquire pejorative connotations. This was related to what was seen as degrading agricultural work.

The term Humba (or Lumbwa) was used by various Bantu-speaking communities of the East African hinterland to refer to 19th century, Iloikop pastoralists.

In present-day central Tanzania, the Loikop were known to their Bantu-speaking neighbors as Ilumbwa ("the well diggers") because they occupied the dry steppes dotted with ancient wells.

The Ngaa traditions of the Meru people of Kenya indicate that the Ngaa moved through arid country following the conquest. Certain elements of the A-Athi traditions suggest a period in northern Kenya or southern Ethiopia. These narratives concur with Yaaku traditions that state that the people that would be known as Yaaku moved south, from southern Ethiopia to Mount Kenya.

== Yaaku interaction ==
Meru oral history describes the arrival of their ancestors at Mount Kenya where they interacted with a community referred to as Lumbwa. The narratives relating to the arrival of the Ngaa state that there were two communities resident at the mountain at the time of their arrival. Both these communities appear more readily distinguished internally than externally. These traditions state that;

During the 1730s the Ngaa traveled north and west through today's Mbeere region, moving along a line of forested hills that run from the modern Mount Kiburu (then, Orimba Hill), to Mount Kiaga. In so doing, they impinged upon a territory then inhabited by two other peoples, subsequently to be known as the Cuka (or Chuka) and Tharaka.
At that time both those societies were divided into two smaller sections. The early Cuka were then known as Chabugi and Irari; the Tharaka as Mbugi (or Diacho) and Chagala (or Murutu). The sharing of one name between the two societies suggests a long association between them, including frequent intermarriage. This in turn would appear to reflect the growth of economic interdependence between peoples who lived in a mountain forest and those who herded livestock on an arid plain.

— J. Fadiman, 1994

=== Way of life ===
According to Igoji and Igoji and Imenti, the Umpua were "tall, slender, cattle-keeping people [who] wore shoulder-length hair, plaited into braids". The pastoral tradition it appears, would be maintained into the 20th century. Fosbrooke (who interviewed many Maasai in East Africa from 1938 to 1948) noted that his subjects repeatedly told him that they shared a common pastoralist origin with the "Lumbwa", who had adopted agriculture only recently.

Igoji and Imenti traditions aver the 'Umpua' of the region, kept their livestock in pits at night. These 'holes' were dug by the herders and were gradually deepened as mud was removed after the wet season. They associate the archaeological landscape feature commonly known as Sirikwa holes that are found in Meru County, where they are known as "Agumba holes", to this community.

== Bantu interaction: c.1730 ==
According to Fadiman's account, the traditions emerging from the period of the 'Mukuruma, Michubu and subsequent age-sets (1730s-1860s)' are told from the perspective of 'single clans, as they advanced upward into the forests or across the Tigania plain'. He notes that an analysis of the traditions indicate that the incoming communities met non-Bantu cultures then resident at Mount Kenya. These included;

- Small groups of Eastern Cushitic-speaking (Galla) peoples within the woodland zone, along the mountains arid base and into the Tigania plains.
- Somewhat larger communities of Maa-speaking (Maasai, Ogiek) peoples within the Tigania Plain and adjacent grasslands, north of the mountain itself

The dates and directions of expulsion vary slightly among Meru regions. For instance, it is said to have been pushed northeast, onto Mount Kenya's northern plains, where they held out until scattered years later by raiding Maasai. Others were gradually forced up the mountain (i.e. west).

=== Kagairo ===
Certain elements of the narrative are similar to Meru narratives of a period recalled as Kagairo. They note that sometime, "perhaps in the late 1730s" the original Ngaa nucleus separated into two segments, each of which took on an identity of its own. One was known as Mukunga (or Muku Ngaa: people of Ngaa) and the other as Murutu. Both these sections are said to have moved in their traditional direction of march. At a point that tradition places near today's Ntugi Hill, however, they fragmented once more. The Muku-Ngaa appear to have divided into four or perhaps five smaller sections.

Meru traditions states that one section of the Muku-Ngaa sections moved northward toward the heavily forested mountains of the Nyambeni range, which stretches northeast from the base of Mount Kenya. Three others are said to have moved west, into the foothills that make up the lowest portions of modern Igoji, Abogeta (South Imenti), and Abothoguchi (North Imenti). The final group drifted south sometime in the 1880s eventually entering that part of the Mwimbi region that lies adjacent to modern Muthambi, seizing this area from the early Cuka.

The directions of dispersal and order in which they are narrated bear similarity to the extent/grazing grounds of the 'Wakuafi' whom Krapf writes about in 1854, stating that;

...the main strength of the Wakuafi is concentrated around the Oldoinio eibor in a country called Kaputei, whence (they) proceed to the North, North-East, West and South...

— Ludwig Krapf, 1854

Krapf states further on that "regarding Oldoinio eibor it is necessary to remark that by this term is meant the Kirénia or Endurkenia, or simply Kenia, as the Wakamba call it..." He does however specifically reference a community referred to as Lumbwa present in the general Laikipia region about the mid-19th century when he notes that: "To the North-East of the Neiwasha are the tribes Sukku, Sodeki, Walúmbua, Nganassa, Ndoizo, Lekipia, whence there is a journey of 24 days to Barawa on the Somali-coast...".

== Iloikop wars: c.1830 ==
Narratives recorded by MacDonald (1899) regarding the Iloikop wars state that at the time of fragmentation of the Loikop peoples, there was a certain internal jealousy that gradually developed into open conflict. MacDonald noted that;

Civil war broke out between the Masai and Guash Ngishu who were helped by their kinsmen of Lykipia. After some initial defeats, the Masai detached the Sambur of Lykipia from the hostile alliance and then crushed the Guash Ngishu so utterly that the latter could no longer hold their own against the dispossessed Nandi and their kindred, and ceased to exist as a tribe.

— MacDonald, 1899

Thompson writing in 1883 also recorded accounts of the conflict, stating;

Grown bold, they attacked the Masai about fifteen years ago...The Masai were at first beaten, but fighting with the stubbornness of despair, they disputed every foot of the ground. They were driven from the whole of Naivasha and Kinangop, and their enemies still victorious, carried the war into Kapte. Matters now changed however. The Masai of the entire region to the south gathered together and came to the assistance of their brethren of Kapte. Soon the tables were turned and the Wa-kwafi were gradually forced back.

— Thompson, 1883

Stigand (1913) also made note of the decision and intention of the Laikipiak to "attack and completely overwhelm the southern Masai...that they might cease to exist as a tribe". However, "when the southern Masai heard that they were coming, they combined together and came forth to meet them. They met the Loikop north of Nakuru...". Stigand gave a detailed account of the battle, one that has been retold since within a number Kenyan of communities.

Thompson later recounts a trek past 'Giligili' where he noticed "an ernomous Masai kraal, which could not have held less than 3000 warriors, and then some distance beyond appeared another of equal, if not larger dimensions." On inquiry, Thompson learned that these were the respective camps of the Masai of Kinangop and Kapte, on the one hand, and the Masai (Wa-kwafi) of Lykipia on the other. He was told that this was; "During one of their long periods of deadly fighting, in which they thus settled down before all their cattle, and fought day after day, till one gave in".

== Late 19th century ==
By the late 19th century, the term Lumbwa primarily referred to the Kipsigis community. It was primarily adopted by the colonial government for administrative purpose and in reference to the region occupied by the Kipsigis who had since abandoned pastoralism culture and embraced agricultural lifestyle.

Kipsigis and Nandi had been a united identity through to the early nineteenth century. About this time they moved southwards through country occupied by Masai, "probably the present Uasin Gishu country" where they accidentally got split in two by a wedge of Masai who Orchadson records as being "Uasin Gishu (Masai) living in Kipchoriat (Nyando) valley". Accounts from Hollis however refer to a "branch called 'L-osigella or Segelli [who] took refuge in the Nyando valley but were wiped out by the Nandi and Lumbwa. It was from them that the Nandi obtained their system of rule by medicine-men.

== Decline of Lumbwa identity ==
Eliot (1905), giving an 'account of the British East African Protectorate', stated that the inhabitants of the Lumbwa region "are closely allied to the Nandi, and speak almost the same language.".

The Kipsigis traditions recorded by Orchadson concur on a united identity, and also give the early nineteenth century as the date of fragmentation.
