= Firestick =

Firestick, fire-stick or fire stick may refer to:

== Plants ==
- Firestick plant, Euphorbia tirucalli
- Firestick tree, Premna acuminata

== Religion and mythology ==
- A ceremonial pole
- The parents of the god Agni
- A symbol of the goddess Vesta
- An historical time for the Athi people
- Part of a meditative ritual in the Kaivalya Upanishad

== Other uses ==
- The Fire drill (tool) used for lighting fires before the invention of matches
- Fire Stick, winner of the 1984 D.C. McKay Stakes horse race
- A Zulu name for bishop William Taylor (1821–1902)
- Pyrobaculum (Latin: fire stick), a single celled organism
- A fictional device in the TV series Fireman
- The .50-120 Federal FireStick, a blank propellant cartridge for certain models of inline muzzleloader rifles

== See also ==
- Old Fire Stick, a 1986 reggae album by Frankie Jones
- "Old Fire Stick", a 1990 single by Aswad, produced by Gussie Clarke
- Fire-stick farming, a method of land management in Australia
- Amazon Fire TV § Fire TV Stick
- Fire iron
- Fire lance, a weapon
- Fire staff
