= Mbwaa =

Mbwaa is an origin narrative of the Meru peoples of Kenya. It is a widely told tale that has been narrated for at least three centuries. These traditions have been widely linked to the Shungwaya origin narrative. However it has been noted that a number of inconsistencies appear in the telling of this narrative. It thus may be, a conflation of two or more peoples origin narratives. Indeed subsequent events in the narrative lead up to the assimilation of two peoples, referred to as Muku-Ngaa and Murutu, both of whom contribute to the present Meru identity.

== Name ==
The location is commonly referred to as Mbwaa.

== Time period ==
Meru traditions agree that their identity formed on Mbwaa. According to traditions captured by Fadiman (1960's), the last age-set recalled to have lived on Mbwaa were the Ntangi, a period dated to circa 1700.

We began on Mbwaa...It was the time when the men of Ntangi were warriors.

— Meru chronicles

== Way of life ==
The way of life practiced on Mbwaa includes practices of both communities. It is presently unclear to whom what pertains.

=== Trade ===
In the telling, the people of Mbwaa were traders. They sold ivory to a figure referred to as Mukuna Ruku around whom a body of related folklore has grown. According to certain traditions, this ivory was sourced from a group of people referred to as Nguo Ntuni who lived within small walled villages that were scattered at various points on the mainland and used as trading centers.

Mukuna Ruku lived behind a log stockade that the Nguo Ntuni had constructed on the mainland. He had red skin, which he kept covered at all times with cloth, a fact the islanders found odd. Mukuna Ruku is described to have been unique in that he never appeared or spoke to the islanders. Instead, men of Mbwaa left heavy loads of ivory at the narrow gate of the stockade. Then they beat upon a piece of wood that hung nearby (gakuna ruku: to beat a piece of wood) and having drawn attention they withdrew from view.

The gate then opened, and Mukuna Ruku took the tusks, leaving prescribed amounts of beads in exchange ("placing tucu, marutia, and ngambi (beads) into the horn"). He beat the wood once more to attract the islanders' attention, then left. No word was spoken on either side.

=== Fishing ===
As told, the economy of the island was based largely on fishing. Men carved small wooden hooks to catch tiny fish along the reefs.

=== Agriculture ===
Accounts indicate that men of Mbwaa also kept goats, sheep, and short-horned cattle. Through trade they acquired donkeys from a people re-called as Cucu (Somali). The donkeys drew water from shallow wells dug near the island's center. The wells also supported crops of millet and yams, supplemented by sugar cane, bananas, and sap from a palm that was brewed into beer.

== Conquest & Invasion ==
In all accounts, the people of Mbwaa were conquered by an invading people that appear to have a different way of life. Inconsistencies however are found in the description of the invaders. The conquest and invasion traditions contain within them a number of narratives that can and have been tangentially linked to either the Ngaa or Murutu communities.

=== Ngaa traditions ===
In some accounts, the invaders arrive in a large sailing vessel that landed on the mainland opposite the islands western shore. Invaders from the ships then crossed the intervening waters on crude wooden rafts.

These accounts tend to refer to the invaders as Nguruntune, or red-legs, a term that the Batu speaking peoples used in olden days to refer to non-Africans such as Europeans, Persians and Arabs. Writing on these traditions, Fadiman states...

They appeared in a large sailing vessel that landed on the mainland, opposite the island's western shore. The ship's crew then crossed the intervening waters on crude wooden rafts. The invaders are remembered as taller and lighter skinned than the islanders...Informants differ on the nature of the conquest. Some state that there was a single battle in which the use of the guns proved decisive...

— Fadiman, 1994

These elements of Fadiman's narrative bear similarity to Osório's account of The Battle of Brava (1507). This city, present day Barawe in Somalia is located due east/north-east of where the people of Ngaa, who migrated west, would later end up. It is peopled today by the people of Somalia, with whom the people of Ngaa are said to have traded with. Further the general region is Cushitic speaking as the Ngaa (Yaaku) people are thought to have been. All these tangential links would seem to be affirmed by the apparent link between the early Mukunu Ruku narrative and the accounts of the Captaincy of the Malindi coast. Moreover, they are borne out by the remarkable similarity in narratives, set almost two centuries apart. Osório states that...

Cugna having finished his business at Melinda, now (sailed north). He steered next for Brava...Having anchored in this port, he immediately sent Leonel Coutign (on a long boat) to wait on the heads of this place...Cugna, having discovered this artifice, resolved immediately to assault the city...He drew up his men on the shore, and formed them into two lines: the first which consisted of 900 men, he gave to Alphonso Albuquerque and he himself headed the second, in which there were 600 soldiers. In the city there was a garrison of 4000 men; of these 2000 immediately sallied forth...The conflict was severe, but the Portuguese charged the enemy with so much fury...The fight was continued with the utmost fury on both fides, till Cugna came up, whose approach struck such a damp into the enemy, that they fled with the greatest precipitation...

— Osório, 1752

=== Flight ===
The narratives concerning the flight from Mbwaa, more so those that deal with the immediate escape also bear remarkable similarity to Osório's account.

...elaborate plans were made for the flight. Specific clans were designated to carry and protect certain objects while on the march. The yam, for example, was carried by the clan now known as Abwekana (gikana: yam stem)... When night fell, every dwelling in the village was set afire, thereby providing the great glow in the sky...The warrior band set out immediately afterward, leaving by the light of the moon.

— Fadiman, 1994

Fadiman's understanding of the narratives he took lead him to state that in his estimation, "...The Nguo Ntuni may originally have come merely to plunder, perhaps attracted by the occasional tusks the islanders brought to trade.". here too, the Meru narratives and Fadiman's understanding of them find exceptional congruence in Osório's narrative;

The city being plundered, vast booty was carried aboard the ships... The Portuguese lost about fifty of their men, and several were dangerously wounded; eighteen more perished in the long boat, which through insatiable avarice they had loaded so immoderately...The city being plundered, Cugna ordered it to be fired, and thus it was reduced to ashes, the enemy at a little distance beholding this dismal spectacle...

— Osório, 1752

=== Murutu traditions ===
There are narratives that give a picture of an invasion, as opposed to a single instance conflict. In these accounts, the residents did not immediately leave. Rather they refer to invaders who wore a single, red cloth, tied around the waist and at the shoulder, and bound another around their heads. Each carried a short sword of the scimitar type, of which the blade curved backwards and only the outer edge was honed. These narratives tend to portray a period of submission to the new rulers before which the islanders grew hostile, refusing to herd flocks and till fields as commanded. All these are congruent with present understanding of Shungwaya traditions.
