= Ngaa people =

Historical ethnic group of Kenya

The Ngaa people were a community that according to the traditions of many Kenyan communities inhabited regions of the Swahili coast and the Kenyan hinterland at various times in history.

== History ==
=== Origins ===
According to Meru traditions, the people of Ngaa originally lived on an island recalled as Mbwaa or Mbwa. They were later driven out of the island, forcing them to move into the Kenyan hinterland. Certain traditions such as those of the hunting section of the pre-Meru community suggests that this location was in the north of Kenya. These traditions contain explicit portrayals of an "arid" place where the game hunted included Grévy's zebra and reticulated giraffe. These species are endemic to the north of Kenya.

== Ngaaruni ==
According to Meru oral literature, the Ngaa identity formed at the point when the migrants from Mbwaa turned "westward" into "what tradition explicitly calls a desert" during their journey. They named this place Ngaaruni (arid place). Tradition records that while at the arid place, the migrants would draw water from what were known in Meru as the "elephant's footsteps". Fadiman notes that this is an "ancient Meru euphemism for areas of shallow papyrus swamp so large they took several days to walk around".

== Kirorero ==
The first of these 'elephant foot-steps' was known as Kirorero (dreaming to a purpose; prophecy). Here the migrants dwelt peacefully for several seasons. The Yaaku and Mukogodo narratives indicate that over the course of this period, the Ngaa people moved south from a location around Southern Ethiopia. See;

- Yaaku people
- Mukogodo people
- Woto

== c.1730 ==
=== Contact with Nilotic communities ===
In the narratives of various Meru informants, contact with Nilotic communities occurred on the star grass zone or lower forest ranges of Mount Kenya. The totality of traditions indicate that these communities belonged to one or more sections of the Kalenjin-speaking peoples.

=== Lumbwa ===
According to Igoji and Imenti informants, the Umpua were a tall, slender, cattle-keeping people. They herded small numbers of cattle and goats and lived solely from the milk and meat of their herds. The Umpua kept their livestock in pits at night. These were dug by the herders themselves and were gradually deepened as mud was removed after the rains. The earth and dung were heaped next to the pit to form a mound, within which the Umpua are recalled as having placed their dead.

=== Agumba ===
Meru traditions recorded in Mwimbi and Muthambi recount that the pastoral Lumbwa lived in association with a hunting community remembered as Agumba (or Gumba). The Gumba were said to live in "Agumba pits", large or squarish depressions, located along a line that runs roughly along the zone at 7,000–7,500 feet. This zone delineates the lowest edge of the forest from the highest point in the star-grass zone.

== Muku-Ngaa identity ==
During a period recalled as Kagairo, "perhaps in the late 1730s" the original Ngaa nucleus separated into two segments, each of which took on an identity of its own. One was known as Mukunga (or Muku Ngaa: people of Ngaa) and the other as Murutu. Both these sections are said to have moved in their traditional direction of march. At a point that tradition places near today's Ntugi Hill, however, they fragmented once more. The Muku-Ngaa appear to have divided into four or perhaps five smaller sections.

- One moved northward toward the heavily forested mountains of the Nyambeni range, which stretches northeast from the base of Mount Kenya.
- Three others moved west, into the foothills that make up the lowest portions of modern Igoji, Abogeta (South Imenti), and Abothoguchi (North Imenti).
- The final group drifted south sometime in the 1880s eventually entering that part of the Mwimbi region that lies adjacent to modern Muthambi, seizing this area from the early Cuka.

== 1836 ==
=== Nkuthuku age-set ===
The narrative of the 'elephant's footsteps' notes that during their stay at Kirorero, the initiation of an age-set Nkuthuku occurred and that from this place the migrants moved 'either north or west'. The Nkuthuku Meru period appears analogous to the cognate Lkipiku period (also Il Kipkeku, starting c.1837) of the Sambur who occupied territory adjacent to the Meru at this time. It was also marked by a three-way separation, and it followed the 1830s mutai. This period was marked by an age-set named Il-kipku and followed by the Loikop period. The latter saw the emergence of descendant Kwavi communities who occupied territory north and west of Mount Kenya, one of which was the short-lived Guas'Ngishu.

== Thingithu ==
The second area of swampland large enough to sustain the group was discovered. This was named Thingithu and it supported them for three seasons. Among the actors of the Meru Thingithu was the Ngiithi community, which again finds parallels in the short-lived Uasin Gishu period. This period is further paralleled by the Nithir period of Turkana, where tradition indeed avers that about this time "some far-ranging contingents of Bantu-speaking Meru were absorbed by several Turkana clans".

=== Loikop fragmentation ===
According of the traditions recorded by Fadiman, conflict with the Muoko community had been ongoing for "decades". However, a notable period of intense Tigania pressure brought the Muoko within raiding range of the Il Tikirri (recalled in Tigania as Ngiithi) and Mumunyot (recalled as Rimunyo) communities.

The Ngiithi and Rimunyo communities began to raid the Muoko from the north at the same time that Tiganian pressure intensified in the south. Consequently, Muoko communities gradually disintegrated as their herds were seized and absorbed by former foes. These traditions particular of later stages, deal primarily with the seizure of Muoko children for Meru homesteads or the adoption of captive Muoko warriors into Tiganian clans.

— J.Fadiman, 1994

Fadiman postulates that the absorption of former foes may have therefore significantly modified Tigania institutions and, indirectly, those of adjacent Meru regions as well.

Following their stay at 'Thingithu', they moved to a third area (Rurii), a fourth (Tubaranya) and a fifth (Irikinu). The later stages of this journey are associated with extreme aridity, the people of Ngaa survived 'only by digging holes ("to the height of two men") in seasonal riverbeds".

At some time during this period the people of Ngaa passed an area remembered as Kiiru (raised place) where "four white peaks" could be seen.
