= CS/LR19 =

Chinese Sniper Rifle

CS/LR19 (NSG-85) Sniper Rifle
- Type: Semi-Automatic Sniper Rifle
- Place of origin: China

Service history
- In service: 2014-Present
- Used by: People's Armed Police People's Police

Production history
- Designer: Norinco
- Designed: 2010-2014
- Manufacturer: Shandong Zhongdun Police-Used Equipment Co., Ltd.
- Produced: 2014-Present

Specifications
- Mass: 5.6 kg (12 lb)
- Length: 1,280 mm (50 in)
- Barrel length: 620 mm (24 in)
- Cartridge: 7.62x54R
- Caliber: 7.62mm
- Action: Semi-automatic
- Muzzle velocity: 831 m/s (2,730 ft/s)
- Effective firing range: 800 m (870 yd)
- Feed system: 10 round detachable magazine
- Sights: Telescopic; night-vision; thermal; red dot; holographic sights

The CS/LR19 Sniper Rifle (Chinese: CS/LR19式狙击步枪; pinyin: CS/LR19 shì jūjī bùqiāng) also known as the NSG-85, is a semi-automatic sniper rifle designed by Norinco and manufactured by Shandong Zhongdun Police-Used Equipment Co., Ltd. in China. The CS/LR19 was first publicly shown in the 7th China International Police Equipment Expo held in Beijing, China. It is also offered to the international market and was shown in the 2014 Eurosatory exhibition in France. It is an upgraded version of the Chinese copy of the Dragunov SVD rifle, the Type 85. It is chambered in 7.62x54R cartridge.

== Design ==
The CS/LR19 is a semi-automatic, gas-operated sniper rifle. There is a manual gas regulator to adjust the action. The stock has been replaced with polymer from the Dragunov SVD and has a thumb-hole design, with a rubber butt-pad and adjustable cheek rest, as well as a retractable monopod.

The CS/LR19 can be seen as an upgraded version of the Dragunov SVD or the Type 85. A bipod was added to the front, iron sights and bayonet mounts were removed, there is a free-floating barrel, and all wooden parts, including the stock and handguard, have been replaced with polymer alternatives instead. A Picatinny rail was added to the top and sides of the handguard, with the top rail stretching across the whole length of the upper receiver, allowing the installation of telescopic sights, thermal sights, night-vision sights, red dot sights, or holographic sights.

The gun features a rotary bolt with three radial locking lugs at the front. It is fed by detachable double-stack box magazines with a 10-round capacity.
