= Mukogodo people =

Ethnic group in Kenya

The Mukogodo, are a people who are said to have lived in regions of central Kenya around Mt. Kenya, possibly through to the 18th century. A community known as the Yaaku later moved into their territory and the Mukogodo, adopted the Yaaku language, referred to as Yaakunte. The Yaaku community was later assimilated by a food producing population and they lost their way of life. Their language, Yaakunte, was kept alive for some time by the Mukogodo who had all along maintained their own hunter-gathering way of life. However, the Mukogodo were later assimilated by the Maasai and adopted the Maa language. The Yaakunte language is today facing extinction but is undergoing a revival movement. In the present time, the terms Yaaku and Mukogodo (sometimes Mukogodo Maasai), are used to refer to a population living in Mukogodo forest west of Mount Kenya.

== Etymology ==
The name Mukogodo is a Yaakunte word meaning people who live in rocks.

== History ==
=== Origins ===
According to Mukogodo traditions recorded by Mhando (2008), the Mukogodo people are ancestral to Mount Kenya. At the very least their traditions do not go further back than their presence in that region.

=== Yaaku interaction ===
The territory of the original Mukogodo was impinged upon by a community referred to as Yaaku. The Yaaku practiced a herding and cultivation way of life. They spoke a Cushitic language that is today called Yaakunte.

== Way of life ==
=== Subsistence ===
At the time of Mukogodo and Yaaku interaction, the latter lived by hunting and gathering. An area of particular focus appears to have been bee-keeping, a heritage maintained by the Mukogodo Maasai today.

The (Mukogodo) lifestyle revolved around hunting, beekeeping, trapping and gathering. They occasionally hunted and trapped both small and large animals besides their day to day foraging activities...Even though Mukogodo hunters did pursue a wide variety of species, the main source of meat in their diet was the rock hyrax because it was simple to capture.

— Mhando, 2008

=== Shelter ===
The Mukogodo made their homes in caves hence the appellation applied to them.

=== Tools ===
The main tools of the Mukogodo hunter were his bow and arrows. The latter which were carried in wooden quivers with leather lids and shoulder straps. Their shafts were made from a reedy plant and were fitted with iron tips. These tips were purchased in trade with their neighbors as the Mukogodo had no blacksmiths of their own.

=== Trade ===
The Mukogodo hunted rhinoceros for their horn, which they traded with their neighbors for livestock, crops, and manufactured goods like beads and iron.

== Mukogodo assimilation ==
The Mukogodo appear to have lived in association with the Yaaku in that the Mukogodo in whose localities the Yaaku settled, adopted the Yaakunte language. However, they maintained their hunter-gathering way of life.

== Language decline ==
The Mukogodo/Yaaku assimilated to the pastoralist culture of the Maasai in the first half of the twentieth century (1920's and 30's), although some still keep bees. The reason for this transition is mostly one of social prestige. The Maasai look down upon hunter-gatherer peoples, calling them Dorobo ('the ones without cattle'), and many Mukogodo/Yaaku consider the Maasai culture superior to their own.

=== Adoption of Maasai language ===
As a result of the decision to transition to pastoralism, the Mukogodo/Yaaku largely gave up their Cushitic language Yaaku for the Eastern Nilotic Maasai language between 1925 and 1936.

=== Yaakunte revival ===
- Yaaku language, for details of the language and revival movement

== Yaaku today ==
In the present time, both the terms Yaaku and Mukogodo, sometimes Mukogodo Maasai are used to refer to a population living in Mukogodo forest west of Mount Kenya.

== See also ==
- Athi people
- Yaaku people
- Dorobo
- Language shift
