= 7.62 mm caliber =

Caliber of ammunition

SSA 7.62mm 143gr AP rifle cartridge, bullet

The 7.62 mm caliber is a nominal caliber used for a number of different cartridges. Historically, this class of cartridge was commonly known as .30 caliber, the equivalent in Imperial and United States Customary measures. It is most commonly used in hunting cartridges. The measurement equals 0.30 inches or three decimal lines, written .3″ and read as three-line.

The 7.62 mm designation refers to the internal diameter of the barrel at the lands (the raised helical ridges in rifled gun barrels). The actual bullet caliber is often 7.82 mm (0.308 in), although Soviet weapons commonly use a 7.91 mm (0.311 in) bullet, as do older British (.303 British) and Japanese (7.7×58mm Arisaka) cartridges.

== Pistol cartridges ==
Many pistol cartridges are in this caliber; the most common are:

- 7.62×25mm Tokarev, also known as 7.62 mm TT, is used in the Tokarev pistol, and many of the World War II Soviet submachine guns
- 7.63×25mm Mauser, which was the basis for, and has nearly identical dimensions to, the Tokarev, but has different loading specifications.
- 7.65×25mm Borchardt, from which the Mauser, Parabellum, and Tokarev cartridges were developed
- 7.65×21mm Parabellum
- 7.65×17mm Browning, more commonly known as .32 ACP
- 7.62mm SP-2, used only in the TKB-506 cigarette case pistol
- 7.62x35mm Lahti, used in the AL-43 submachine gun

== Revolver cartridges ==
Some of the revolver cartridges in this caliber are:

- 7.62×38mmR is used only in the Nagant M1895 revolver.
- .32 Long Colt – originally chambered for small-frame Colt revolvers and the Marlin model 1892 rifle, this cartridge uses a heeled bullet with a case the same diameter as the major diameter of the bullet. It shares dimensions with the .32 rimfire cartridge of the same length. It is not to be confused with the .32 Colt's New Police cartridge.
- .32 S&W Long is also known as .32 Colt's New Police when chambered in Colt revolvers. The original loading for this cartridge used a round nose, or flattened round nbered widely in revolvers made in the US and Europe through World War II. This cartridge is used in several modern target pistols (not revolvers) with flush-seated wadcutters. The short version of this cartridge (.32 S&W) was chambered in many break-top revolvers at the end of the 19th and beginning of the 20th centuries in the US and Europe.
- .32 H&R Magnum is the only revolver cartridge in this caliber in wide use today, mostly in small-frame revolvers. This is an extended version of the much earlier .32 S&W Long, which is an extended version of the .32 S&W.
- .327 Federal Magnum is a new cartridge developed jointly by Ruger and Federal. This cartridge is an extended version of the .32 H&R Magnum.

== Rifle cartridges ==
The most common and historical rifle cartridges in this caliber are:

- .30 carbine, used in the M1/M2/M3 carbines, is sometimes called the 7.62×33mm.
- 300 AAC Blackout (7.62×35mm), also known as 300 BLK, is designed for the M4 carbine and STANAG magazine.
- Soviet 7.62×39mm, also known as 7.62 mm Soviet, M43, or occasionally .30 Short Combloc, is designed for the SKS and used in the AK-47, AKM, RPK and RPD light machine guns.
- 7.62×40mm Wilson Tactical.
- 7.62×45mm vz. 52, made solely for the Czechoslovak vz. 52 rifle, was replaced by 7.62×39mm.
- 7.62×51mm NATO and its civilian variant .308 Winchester, sometimes described as .308 NATO by people mixing Imperial and Customary measurements, is used by some civilians, with metric measurements used by NATO.
- 7.62×53mmR, Finnish design based on the Russian 7.62×54mmR round.
- 7.62×54mmR, another Russian cartridge, it was first used in the Mosin–Nagant rifle in 1891. The modern versions of the cartridges are now in wide use in numerous world armies as sniper rifles (particularly the SVD family) and machine guns (numerous types, many developed from AK family, such as the PKM).
- .30-06 Springfield, is a US military cartridge used in World War I, World War II, the Korean War, and the Vietnam War, as well as hunting game, is known as the 7.62×63mm in metric measurement.
- .303 British, used in Lee–Metford and Lee–Enfield rifles, is known as 7.7×56mmR in metric measurement.
- 7.7×58mm Arisaka is used in the Type 99, Type 2 and Type 4 rifles.
- 7.65×53mm Argentine is used in various Mauser bolt-action rifles, primarily in Belgium, Turkey, and Argentina.
- .308 Norma Magnum
- .300 Norma Magnum
- .300 Winchester Magnum is used by many hunting and sniper rifles, sometimes called the 7.62×67mm.
- .300 Winchester Short Magnum
- .300 Lapua Magnum, 7.62×70mm
- .30-30 Winchester, a popular deer hunting cartridge, is typically used in lever-action rifles, such as the Winchester Model 1894 and Marlin Model 336, and is adapted to European sporting guns as 7.62×51mmR.
- .30 R Blaser, used in break-action rifles for hunting medium to large game.
- .30 Thompson Center (.30 TC)
- .30-378 Weatherby Magnum
- 30-40 Krag

== See also ==
- List of rifle cartridges
- 7 mm caliber
- Category:7.62 mm firearms
- M14 rifle
- 30 (disambiguation)
