= .30 R Blaser =

Rifle cartridge

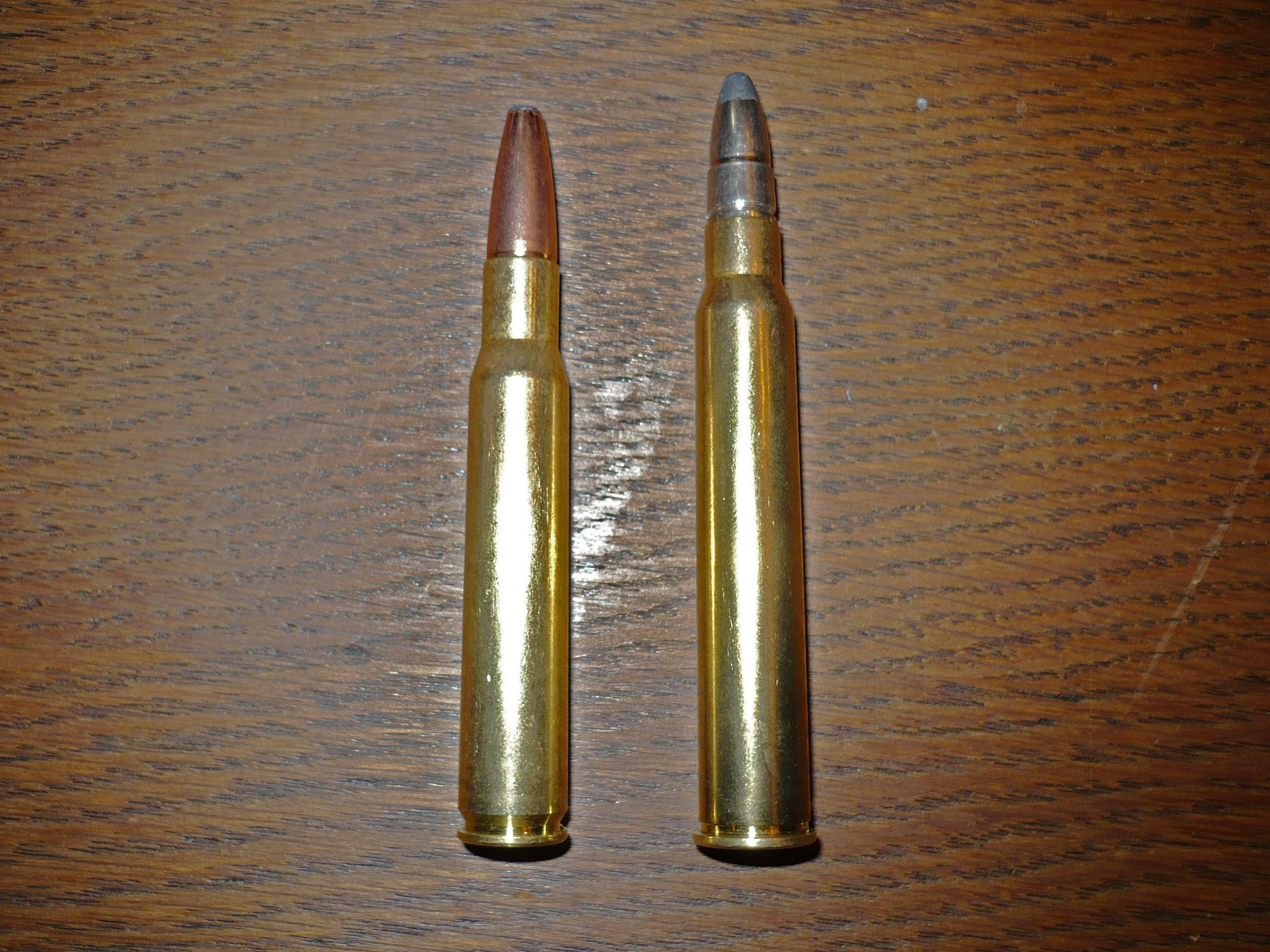
- .30-06 Springfield 11.7 g (180.6 gr) Norma Vulkan (left) and .30 R Blaser 11.7 g (180.6 gr) RWS UNI Classic rifle cartridges
- Type: Rifle
- Place of origin: Germany

Service history
- In service: Never issued

Production history
- Designer: Gerhard Blenk, Blaser, RWS
- Designed: 1991
- Produced: 1992–present

Specifications
- Parent case: None
- Case type: Rimmed, bottleneck
- Bullet diameter: 7.82 mm (0.308 in)
- Neck diameter: 8.73 mm (0.344 in)
- Shoulder diameter: 11.20 mm (0.441 in)
- Base diameter: 12.20 mm (0.480 in)
- Rim diameter: 13.50 mm (0.531 in)
- Rim thickness: 1.40 mm (0.055 in)
- Case length: 68.00 mm (2.677 in)
- Overall length: 95.00 mm (3.740 in)
- Case capacity: 4.94 cm^{3} (76.2 gr H_{2}O)
- Rifling twist: 305 mm (1-12 in)
- Primer type: Large rifle or Large rifle Magnum
- Maximum pressure: 405.00 MPa (58,740 psi)

Ballistic performance
Bullet mass/type	Velocity	Energy
9.7 g (150 gr) KS	940 m/s (3,100 ft/s)	4,285 J (3,160 ft⋅lbf)
10.7 g (165 gr) DK	900 m/s (3,000 ft/s)	4,334 J (3,197 ft⋅lbf)
11.7 g (181 gr) UNI Classic	860 m/s (2,800 ft/s)	4,327 J (3,191 ft⋅lbf)
11.7 g (181 gr) Blaser CDP	940 m/s (3,100 ft/s)	4,724 J (3,484 ft⋅lbf)
13 g (201 gr) KS	800 m/s (2,600 ft/s)	4,147 J (3,059 ft⋅lbf)
- Test barrel length: 600 mm (23.6 in); Source: RWS / RUAG Ammotech

The .30 R Blaser (7.62×68mmR) is a rimmed bottlenecked centerfire cartridge developed for hunting in 1991 by Gerhard Blenk, the then owner of Blaser Jagdwaffen GmbH and Dynamit Nobel which then owned RWS ammunition.

== Design ==
The cartridge is of a new design and was constructed to outperform popular hunting cartridges like the .30-06 Springfield and 7.92×57mm Mauser. When compared with the .30-06 Springfield the .30 R Blaser features an equal maximum chamber pressure of 405 MPa (58,740 psi) piezo pressure - which is fairly high for a rimmed rifle cartridge - but more cartridge case capacity, allowing the use of more propellant. The .30 R Blaser performance does however not reach the power level of .30 caliber magnum cartridges like the .300 Winchester Magnum that feature more cartridge case capacity and higher maximum chamber pressure levels.

The cartridge was commercially introduced in 1992 by Blaser Jagdwaffen (Blaser hunting weapons) and RWS ammunition.

== Cartridge dimensions ==
The .30 R Blaser has 4.94 ml (76 grains H_{2}O) cartridge case capacity. The exterior shape of the case was designed to promote reliable case feeding and extraction in break action rifles.

.30 R Blaser maximum C.I.P. cartridge dimensions. All sizes in millimeters (mm).

Americans would define the shoulder angle at alpha/2 ≈ 20.01 degrees. The common rifling twist rate for this cartridge is 305 mm (1 in 12 in), 4 grooves, Ø lands = 7.62 mm, Ø grooves = 7.82 mm, land width = 4.47 mm and the primer type is large rifle or large rifle magnum depending on the load.

According to the official with C.I.P. (Commission Internationale Permanente Pour L'Epreuve Des Armes A Feu Portative) guidelines the .30 R Blaser case can handle up to 405.00 MPa (58,740 psi) P_{max} piezo pressure. In C.I.P. regulated countries every rifle cartridge combo has to be proofed at 125% of this maximum C.I.P. pressure to certify for sale to consumers. This means that .30 R Blaser chambered arms in C.I.P. regulated countries are currently (2013) proof tested at 506.00 MPa (73,389 psi) PE piezo pressure.

== Contemporary use ==
The versatility of the .30 R Blaser for hunting all kinds of American and European game and the availability of several factory loads and the fact that it uses standard .30 caliber projectiles all contribute to the .30 R Blaser chambering popularity in break action hunting rifles. Loaded with short light bullets it can be used on small European game like fox or medium game such as roe deer and chamois. Loaded with longer heavy bullets it can be used on medium and big European game like wild boar, fallow deer, red deer, moose and brown bear. The .30 R Blaser offers good penetrating ability due to a fast enough twist rate to enable it to fire relatively long, heavy bullets with a high sectional density. The (former) legal banning of (ex) military service cartridges in countries like Belgium, Italy and France, means that the .30 R Blaser can be used for hunting in such jurisdictions.

== See also ==
- List of rimmed cartridges
- List of rifle cartridges
- 7.62 caliber
