= Captaincy of the Malindi coast =

Captaincy in the Portuguese Period in East Africa

The Captaincy of the Malindi coast (Capitania da costa de Melinde) was an administrative office that Portugal maintained in East Africa during the Portuguese Period in East Africa. This was the only administrative office that it maintained in northern East Africa after their withdrawal from Kilwa.

== Origin ==
The origin of the office lay in a government trading factory which had been set up in Malindi in April 1509 and whose special purpose was to have been as a purchasing center for goods needed for the Sofala gold trade

== Appointment ==
The office was usually awarded as a Royal favor but on occasion was also leased out

== Administrative duties ==
The responsibilities of the captaincy were the general supervision of Portuguese interests along the coast.

== Official duties ==
The known duties of the office were the issuing of ships passes.

== Trade ==
The activities of the trading factory continued after the establishment of the office and it has been suggested that the holder attached more importance to conducting this trade than to carrying out their official duties.

There is every indication that trade was carried out as private enterprise and not on an official capacity though there are none as to how this trade was actually conducted.

There are also no indications of direct trade with Portugal and it is thus assumed that all trade was carried out with India.

=== Monopolies ===
The holder of this office held monopolies in the exports of ivory, coir and a resin referred to as 'breu' and which is assumed to be gum copal. They also held monopolies in the import of Indian cotton goods and it is also thought that the holder might have had monopolies on the export of Ambegris. The monopoly exercised did not extend beyond these articles.
