= Agumba people =

The Agumba (also Gumba) were South Cushitic peoples who inhabited the forests of Mount Kenya, but are now either extinct or assimilated.

== Sources ==
The Agumba people are known of only through the oral tradition of the Kikuyu, Embu, and Meru peoples.

== Language ==
The language of the Gumba people (Kirinyaga Cushitic) was likely part of the Mbuguan/Ma'a branch of South Cushitic.

== Origins ==
Routledge notes that the traditions collected among the Kikuyu were "definitely to the...effect that the A'si preceded the Agum'ba and that the latter two people lived side by side in villages". However, according to Meru traditions, the Agumba predated the Athi people in their areas of occupation. A specific instance of tradition relating to rituals also seems to affirm this fact, "A-Athi traditions suggest (that rituals) were adopted ('bought') from earlier hunting peoples whom they encountered as they entered the forest. Neither instance seem to provide a point of origin beyond their presence on Mount Kenya.

== Record of time ==
The Agumba appear to have made use of an 'age' system to define time. The first recalled of these ages is the Manjiri and is in Kikuyu tradition associated with a narrative; "When God had finished the world He spoke to the first man, Mam'-ba. Mam'-ba told his son N'ji-ri to separate the dry land from the waters. N'jiri dug channels, and when he came to the sea built up a bank of sand. The second age, Mandoti, is remembered in Kikuyu tradition as the age of evil doers. According to Kikuyu tradition, the people increased greatly during the third age - Chiera.

A separate instance of Kikuyu tradition states that the Athi lived with the Agumba. They lived together, though separately, but it would appear that some families at least were assimilated into Agumba society...

...The two tribes, it was stated, even went as far as to intermarry.

— Routledge, 1910

Smearing with red-earth became fashionable during the age known as Masai while the Kikuyu are said to have come during the age known as Mathathi. Traditions indicate that they had splintered off from the Kamba.

== Way of life ==
The Bantu migrants found a unique way of life being practiced by the Gumba when they first arrived.

=== Subsistence ===
The Agumba are remembered as being short hunters who used bows and arrows. They are also remembered as beekeepers. The Agumba of Kikuyu tradition may have been pastoralists, or perhaps adopted pastoralism, when they met the 'Asi' for it is noted that they "took charge of the herds" as the Athi wandered off, far and wide.

=== Shelter ===
According to certain Kikuyu traditions, the Gumba dwelt in caves, or pits dug in the earth. Routledge captured traditions that describe a distinctive housing system. The Agumba are said to have,

...lived in the forests and dug pits in which their huts were built. These houses were large and communal, and were roofed with poles, banana leaves and earth.

— Routledge, 1910

=== Iron ===
Routledge states that their informants advised them that Agumba "used bows and arrows, and also had other weapons". They note that in their estimation "they must therefore have possessed iron". However, when they excavated a few of the saucer shaped depression's said to have been former Agumba residences, they only came across fragments of obsidian. They note that the British Museum confirmed that this had been worked by hand. They also found, at the same depth of three feet, fragments of pottery, the charcoal remains of fire and banana seeds. They make note that after the excavation and as they were setting up tent, pieces of obsidian kept coming up in the surface soil.

Contemporary understanding of the Agumba is that they were iron and pottery makers. Within Kikuyu tradition, they are understood to have taught the iron-making skill to the Kikuyu. The working of iron was still practiced by some families living near the deposits described below. At the time of record, this tradition seemed so natural as to be "obviously the outcome of practice". The iron produced by these families was a "very pure form of steel, that (could) be drawn into wire or fashioned into cutting instruments".

==== Deposits ====
Routledge observed and described some deposits which, it was noted, were the only deposits in Kikuyu. It was stated that the only other deposits were located 50 miles away near Kilimanjaro; however, to derive metal from that source required trade with the Akamba or Masai which as of the early 20th century, at least in Routledge's eye's seemed "never to have existed to any appreciable extent". The workings are described as follows;

They form a continuous exposure on one side of the ravine, a cliff some 150 feet in height, creamy pink in color and devoid of any vegetation. The original rock, which is broken down by water to yield the iron bearing sand, is a much decomposed granite, from which can also be extracted a good deal of micaceous clayey matter strongly stained with iron oxide...

— Routledge, 1910

=== Ritual ===
The Agumba of Meru tradition are said to have known and made use of cursing rituals, a practice that they taught to the pre-Meru clans.

A-Athi traditions recorded by Fadiman capture the development of these cursing rituals. They suggest that these rituals were developed by the first hunters who ventured into the forest as defensive mechanisms against fear. The montane (remembered as "black") forest harbored large animals such as buffalo which represented a mortal threat to the A-Athi. In response to the problem, these meat and honey hunters developed a number of defensive rituals. A noted, and perhaps first, example is the 'blow' (ua) or 'bite' (uma). The 'blow' ritual for example consisted of blowing a powdered herbal concoction in the directions of the wind while chanting the phrase "only ants on the paths we shall see no bad thing". This had the psychological effect of creating a moving zone of safety.

According to A-Athi tradition, the defensive rituals such as bite and blow could be prepared only by curse removers known as Aga. The Aga are remembered to have been fellow A-Athi (i.e hunter's). The herbal concoction, would be 'gifted' to an Athi hunter only on request and always in exchange for a specified amount of honey, skins, meat, or horns (used as containers). This arrangement effectively created a marketplace for these rituals.

The initial 'bite' and 'blow' were quickly developed along similar precepts to include the creation of stationary zones of safety around more permanent hunting encampments. This was known as 'Nkima', a word which Fadiman notes carries linguistic connotations of 'stiffness' but which "A-Athi translate as 'skull'". This involved placing an object, such as a horn filled with herbal concoctions or a rounded mass of skins and hide, in the center of the encampment. The supposed effect is that it created a psychological zone of safety for those sleeping therein.

A-Athi traditions state that during the 1700s, conceptual changes begin to appear in the development of these cursing rituals. These appear to have arisen from a fusion of prior practice with the Athi "ax, red-earth and fire-stick" practice which appears to initially have been a property rights and use demarcation system. This resulted in the creation of a 'Ndindi', essentially a stick which was curved with clan markings and smeared with bright red-ochre to enhance visibility. This stick was 'communally cursed' then used to demarcate the hunting zones of the using community.

These traditions portray the development to have arisen out of 'problems over the use of land'. Fadiman does make note of this stating that meat and honey hunters "from every region of the mountain found themselves forced steadily uphill...into regions that grew progressively colder, steeper and less favorable to both beehives and game". These traditions portray the land-use conflict as being with a herding-cultivating community. They do note that following the development of the Ndindi ritual, contact with between these communities diminished steadily.

== Assimilation ==
Routledge notes that the Kikuyu state that the Agumba gradually disappeared from the land following Kikuyu settlement. They note that one tradition states that they went "west to a big forest". Another Kikuyu narrative claims the Agumba were chased away by marabou storks sent by Mwene Nyaga to make way for the Kikuyu.

Kikuyu tradition says that intermarriage with the Gumba produced the Ndorobo people, who were of a stature in between the Gumba and Kikuyu.

== See also ==
- Doko people
