= .50-120 Federal FireStick =

Blank cartridge

Federal FireStick
- Type: Blank cartridge
- Place of origin: United States

Production history
- Designer: Federal Ammunition
- Designed: 2019
- Manufacturer: Federal Ammunition
- Produced: 2020–present
- Variants: .50-100, .50-120

Specifications
- Case type: Rimmed
- Bullet diameter: .50 conical (recommended)
- Primer type: 209 Shotgun

Ballistic performance
Bullet mass/type	Velocity	Energy
270 gr (17 g) Federal Trophy Copper PTHP	1,766 feet per second (538 m/s) (extrapolated)	1,870 foot-pounds force (2,540 J) (extrapolated)
- Test barrel length: 25 inches (64 cm); Source

The Federal FireStick is a proprietary polymer-hulled blank cartridge, introduced in 2020 for the Traditions NitroFire rifle. Containing 100 to 120 grains of Hodgdon 888 black-powder substitute and neither a primer nor a bullet, the round and the rifle designed for it were devised as a way of creating a gun that functions as closely to a modern rifle as possible whilst still being legal in muzzleloader hunting season.

Being supplied with neither a primer nor a projectile, the Federal FireStick blank round can be used as a live-fire cartridge by first inserting a primer manually into the rimmed base, then placing it into the breech of the Traditions NitroFire, much like a traditional shotshell in a break-action shotgun. Finally, a .50 calibre bullet is pushed down the barrel from the front using a ramrod, coming to rest at a narrowed neck that separates the slug from the charge and prevents the user from attempting to fire incompatible ammunition.

== See also ==
- List of rimmed cartridges
