= SVD (rifle) =

Soviet semi-automatic marksman rifle

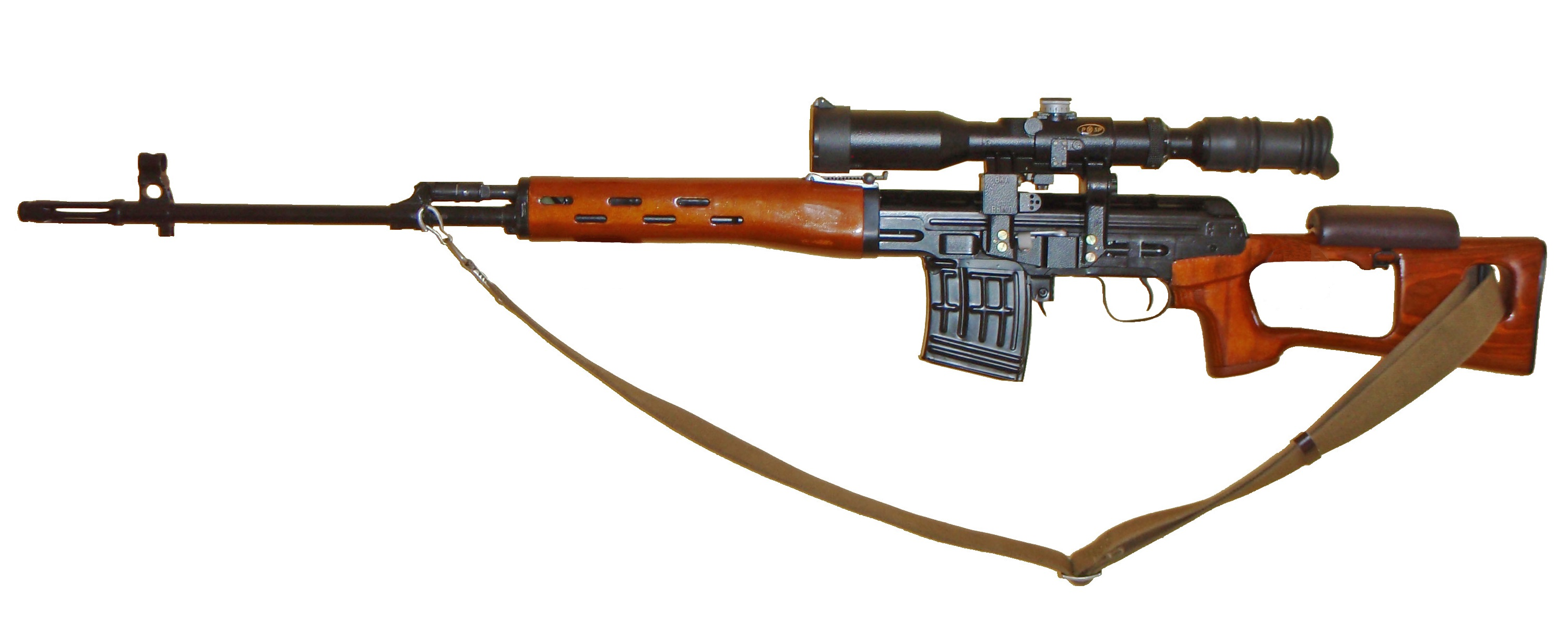
- SVD with a wooden handguard/gas tube cover and skeletonized stock used before the change to synthetic black furniture
- Type: Designated marksman rifle; Sniper rifle
- Place of origin: Soviet Union

Service history
- In service: 1963–present
- Used by: (see § Users)
- Wars: (see § Conflicts)

Production history
- Designer: Yevgeny Dragunov
- Designed: 1958–1963
- Manufacturer: Kalashnikov Concern; Norinco
- Produced: 1963–present
- Variants: (see § Variants)

Specifications
- Mass: 4.30 kg (9.48 lb) (with scope and unloaded magazine); 4.68 kg (10.3 lb) (SVDS); 4.40 kg (9.7 lb) (SVU); 5.30 kg (11.7 lb) (SVDM); 5.02 kg (11.1 lb) (SWD-M)
- Length: 1,225 mm (48.2 in) (SVD); 1,135 mm (44.7 in) stock extended / 875 mm (34.4 in) stock folded (SVDS); 900 mm (35.4 in) (SVU); 1,155 mm (45.5 in) stock extended / 875 mm (34.4 in) stock folded (SVDM); 1,135 mm (44.7 in) (SWD-M)
- Barrel length: 620 mm (24.4 in) (SVD, SWD-M); 565 mm (22.2 in) (SVDS); 600 mm (23.6 in) (SVU); 550 mm (21.7 in) (SVDM)
- Cartridge: 7.62×54mmR
- Action: Gas-operated, short-stroke piston rotating bolt
- Rate of fire: Semi-automatic
- Muzzle velocity: 830 m/s (2,723 ft/s) (SVD); 810 m/s (2,657.5 ft/s) (SVDS); 800 m/s (2,624.7 ft/s) (SVU)
- Effective firing range: 800 m (875 yd)
- Feed system: 10-round detachable box magazine
- Sights: PSO-1 telescopic sight, 1PN51/1PN58 night vision sights and iron sights with an adjustable rear notch sight

The SVD (СВД; Russian: снайперская винтовка Драгунова, romanized: snayperskaya vintovka Dragunova, lit. 'Dragunov sniper rifle'), GRAU index 6V1, is a semi-automatic designated marksman rifle/sniper rifle chambered in the 7.62×54mmR cartridge, developed in the Soviet Union.

== History ==
The SVD was designed to serve in a squad support role to provide precise long-range engagement capabilities to ordinary troops following the Warsaw Pact adoption of the 7.62×39mm intermediate cartridge and assault rifles as standard infantry weapon systems. At the time, NATO used battle rifles chambered for the 7.62×51mm NATO fully powered cartridge as standard infantry weapon systems and had not yet adopted an intermediate cartridge and assault rifle of their own, allowing them to outrange their Warsaw Pact counterparts.

The SVD was developed through 1958–1963 and selected as the winner of a contest that included three competing groups of designers, led by Sergei Simonov (prototype rejected in April 1960), Aleksandr Konstantinov, and Yevgeny Dragunov. Extensive field testing of the rifles conducted in a wide range of environmental conditions (Konstantinov's competing 2B-W-10 prototype was simpler and cheaper but less accurate, durable and reliable) resulted in Dragunov's proposal chambered for the 7.62×54mmR fully powered cartridge being accepted into service in July 1963. An initial pre-production batch consisting of 200 rifles was assembled for evaluation purposes, and from 1964 serial production was carried out by Izhmash, later called Kalashnikov Concern.

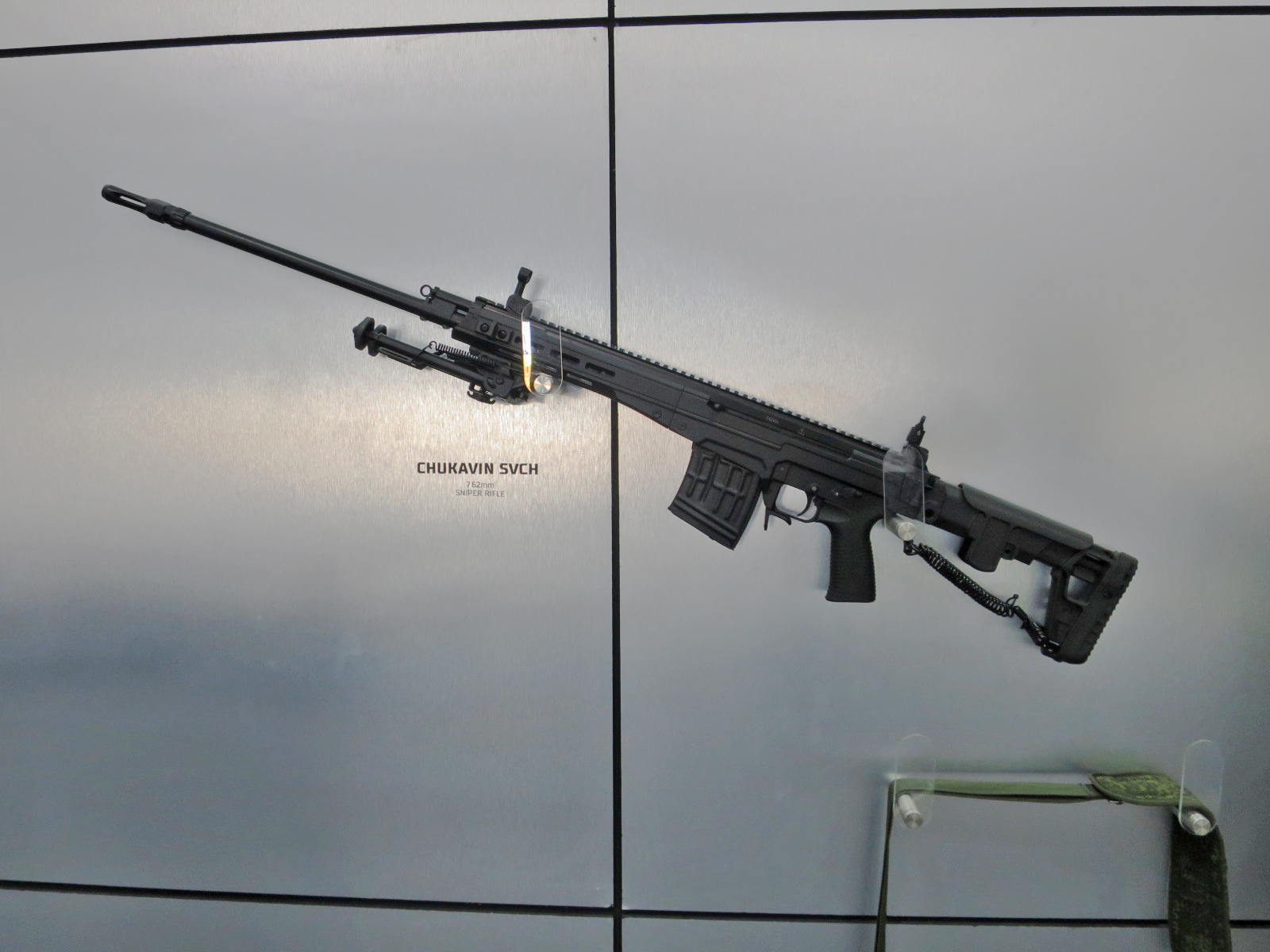
The Chukavin SVCh is intended to replace the SVD in Russian service

Since then, the SVD has become the standard squad support weapon of several countries, including those of the former Warsaw Pact. China produced a copy of the SVD through reverse-engineered samples captured during the Sino-Vietnamese War as the Type 79 and 85. Iran also produced a clone, the Nakhjir 3, which was a direct copy of the Chinese Type 79.

In Russian service, the SVD is to be replaced with the Chukavin SVCh sniper/designated marksman rifle. In February 2023, it was reported that the Chukavin SVCh began to be mass-produced by Kalashnikov Concern. When chambered for the 7.62×54mmR, the Chukavin SVCh uses SVD-compatible box magazines. However, SVD remains in production and service as of 2026.

In Ukrainian service, the SVD was largely replaced in the sniping role with Western sniper rifles chambered in .338 Lapua Magnum or 7.62×51mm NATO cartridges and anti-materiel rifles such as the Barrett M107A1. The domestically produced UAR-10 sniper rifle is also replacing the SVD in Ukrainian military and law enforcement units. According to McNab, the SVD remains in service with Ukrainian forces in the designated marksman rifle role.

== Design ==
The SVD bears a number of cosmetic similarities to the AK family of rifles but these similarities are for the purpose of standardizing manual of arms. This has occasionally led to misidentification of the SVD as an AK variant, and vice versa.

=== Operating mechanism ===
The barrel breech is locked through a rotating bolt (left rotation) and uses three locking lugs to engage corresponding locking recesses in the barrel extension. The rifle has a hammer-type striking mechanism and a manual lever safety selector. In addition to the trigger disconnect, the fire control mechanism has a second disconnector which does not allow the hammer to fall until the bolt has been closed, similar to a sear in a select-fire weapon. However, the SVD was only designed for semi-automatic fire. The firing pin in the SVD is not retained, i.e. "free-floating", and it is therefore possible for accidental discharge to occur as the bolt pushes an unfired cartridge into the chamber, should there be an obstruction in the firing pin channel resulting from poor maintenance or extreme cold.

The firearm is operated by a short-stroke gas piston system with a two-position gas regulator. The gas regulator can be set with the help of the rim of a cartridge. Position #1 leaves a gas escape port opened, whereas position #2 closes the gas escape port and directs extra gas to the piston, increasing the recoil velocity of the gas-piston system and is used for resolving reliability issues, which arise from fouling in the gas port/action, extreme cold, high altitude, or using under-powered ammunition.

The rifle is fed from a detachable curved box magazine with a 10-round capacity and the cartridges are double-stacked in a staggered zigzag pattern. After discharging the last cartridge from the magazine, the bolt carrier and bolt are held back on a bolt catch that is released by pulling the cocking handle to the rear.

The rifle's receiver is machined to improve precision by adding torsional strength.

=== Barrel ===
The barrel profile is relatively thin to save weight. Its bore is chrome-lined for increased corrosion resistance and features four right-hand grooves. Originally, the twist rate was 320 mm (1:12.6 in), as it had been designed for use with heavier civilian ammunition. In 1975 the twist rate was increased to the standard 240 mm (1:9.4 in), which reduced the precision with the 7N1 sniper cartridge by 18% but allowed for the use of standard "light" ball steel core LPS Gzh (57-N-323S), as well as its variations (incendiary, tracer, armour-piercing) with acceptable precision. The front part of the barrel features the front sight assembly and a bayonet lug. The muzzle is equipped with a permanently affixed long-slotted flash hider.

In order to pass inspections at the factory, these rifles must not produce more than a 0.7 MOA median deviation from the expected point of impact in three 10-shot groups using 7N1 (approximately 3 MOA).

=== Ammunition ===
To enable the SVD's desired precision, new 7.62×54mmR "sniper" ammunition, designated 7N1, was designed by V. M. Sabelnikov, P. P. Sazonov and V. M. Dvorianinov in 1966 to meet the new standards. 7N1 sniper cartridges should not produce more than 1.24 MOA extreme vertical spread with 240 mm twist rate barrels and no more than 1.04 MOA extreme vertical spread with 320 mm twist rate barrels in a 5-shot group. The precision requirements demanded of the SVD with 7N1 is similar to the American M24 Sniper Weapon System with M118SB cartridges (1.18 MOA extreme vertical spread) and the M110 Semi-Automatic Sniper System with M118LR ammunition (1.27 MOA extreme vertical spread).

7N1 differed from the standard LPS Gzh (57-N-323S) cartridge in its use of finely extruded propellant and a modified projectile containing a void inside of the jacket at the tip which improved terminal ballistics and a bimetal lead and mild steel core. With standard 57-N-323S cartridges, the precision of the SVD is reduced to 2.21 MOA extreme vertical spread. This ammunition was later replaced by 7N14 in 1999, which replaced the mild steel penetrator with a hardened steel penetrator in response to the development of infantry body armour.

=== Sights ===
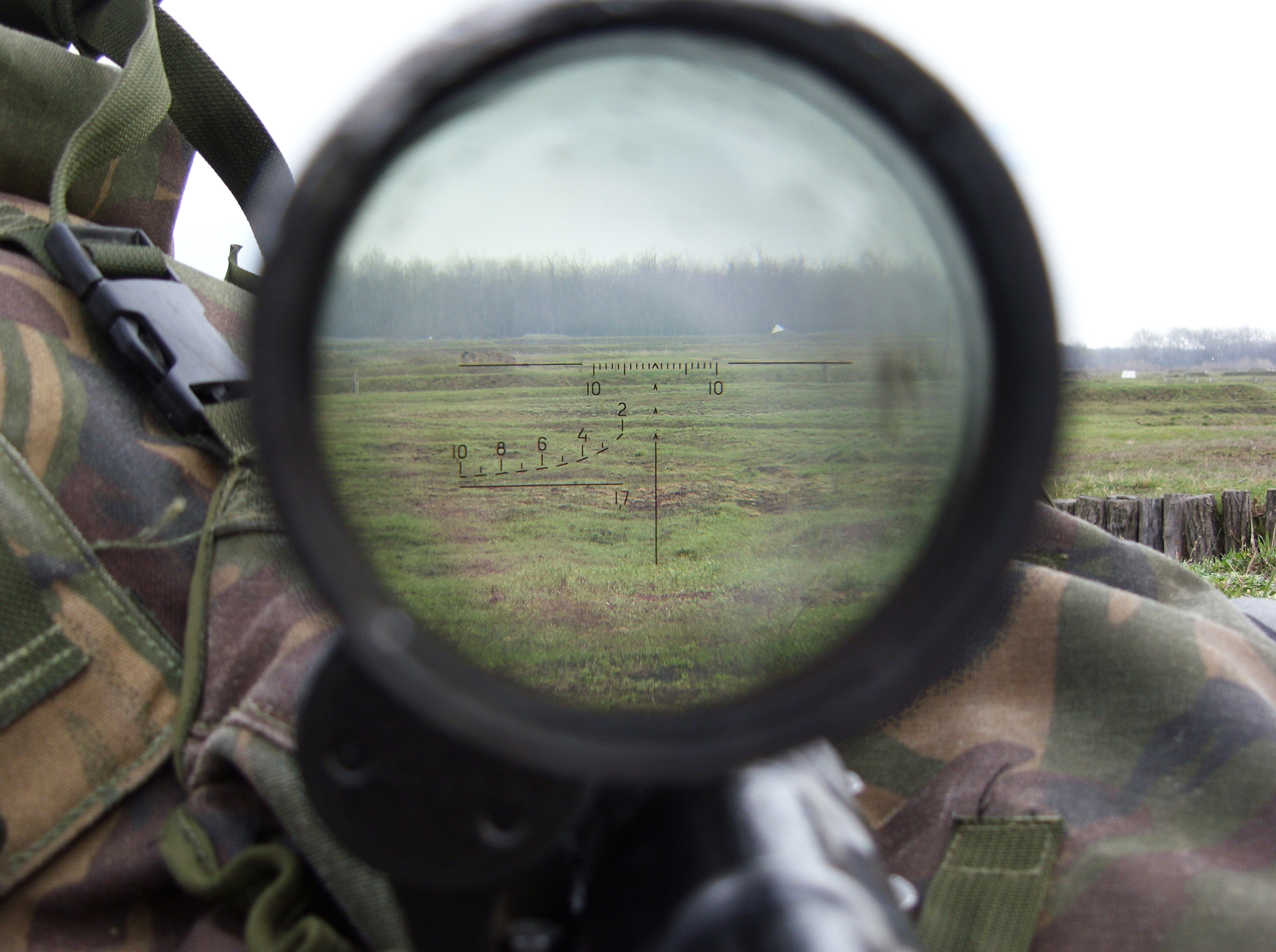
The PSO-1's unique reticle. The rangefinder is in the lower left, chevrons for distances beyond 1,000 m (1,094 yd) are found in the middle, and stadia marks for windage are to the left and right of the center reticule. The reticle is illuminated by a small battery-powered lamp.

The rifle features adjustable iron sights with a sliding tangent rear sight, graduated from 100 to 1,200 m (109 to 1,312 yd) in 100 m (109 yd) increments. The iron sights can be used with or without the standard-issue optical sight in place. This is possible because the scope mount does not block the area between the front and rear sights.

The SVD was originally issued with a detachable PSO-1 optical sight (later upgraded and semi-issued as the PSO-1M2), which mounts to a Warsaw Pact rail on the left side of the receiver. The PSO-1 elevation turret features bullet drop compensation (BDC) in 50 metres (55 yd) or 100 metres (109 yd) increments for engaging point and area targets at ranges from 100 metres (109 yd) up to 1,000 metres (1,094 yd). At longer distances, the shooter must use the chevrons that would shift the trajectory by 100 metres (109 yd) per each chevron. The BDC feature must be tuned at the factory for the particular ballistic trajectory of a particular combination of rifle and cartridge at a predefined air density. With increasing range, inevitable BDC-induced errors will occur when the environmental and meteorological circumstances deviate from the predefined circumstances for which the BDC was calibrated. Marksmen can be trained to understand the main forces acting on the projectile and their effect on their particular gun and ammunition, and the effects of external factors at longer ranges to counter these errors. The PSO-1 sight enables area targets to be engaged at ranges upwards of 1,300 m (1,422 yd); effective ranges in combat situations have been stated at between 600 and 1,300 m (656 and 1,422 yd), depending on the nature of the target (point or area target) quality of ammunition and skill of the shooter.

Several military issue alternative telescopic sights with varying levels of magnification and reticles are available for the SVD. Rifles designated SVDN come equipped with a night sight, such as the NSP-3, NSPU, PGN-1, NSPUM or the Polish passive PCS-5. Rifles designated SVDN-1 can use the passive night sight NSPU-3 (1PN51) and rifles designated SVDN2 can use the passive night sight NSPUM (1PN58).

Commercial non military issue mounts that attach to the Warsaw Pact rail mount can allow use of Picatinny rail-mounted optics.

=== Stock ===
The original SVD had a birch plywood laminate two-piece handguard/gas tube cover and a skeletonized thumbhole stock equipped with a detachable cheek rest; the latter is removed when using iron sights. Beginning in the 80's, wooden parts were replaced with synthetic parts made of a black polymer – the handguard and gas tube cover are more or less identical in appearance, while the thumbhole stock is of a different shape.

=== Accessories ===
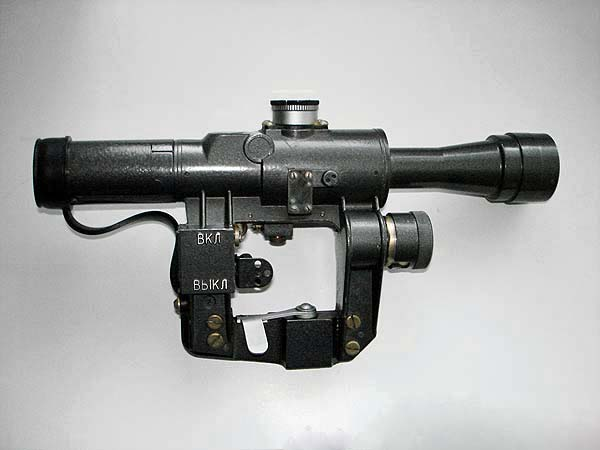
Russian PSO-1M2 military issue 4×24 telescopic sight with the Warsaw Pact rail mounting system.

A number of accessories are issued with the rifle, including a blade-type bayonet (AKM clipped point or the AK-74 spear point bayonet), four spare magazines, a leather or nylon sling, magazine pouch, cleaning kit and an accessory/maintenance kit for the telescopic sight.

Also included is a cold weather battery case with a "shirt clip", with a permanently attached cord [approximately 24" long] ending with another battery case cap that has an extension to press against the internal contact in lieu of the battery to complete the circuit. Placing the external battery case into the shooters' clothing close to the body keeps it from freezing; using the clip ensures it remains in place.

The clamp-style bipod attaches to machined-out reliefs near the front of the receiver, it literally grabs the two cut out areas and securely mounts with a large round sized head on the clamp bolt able to tightly attach the bipod. The legs are individually adjustable [as opposed to fixed length found on many rifles and LMGs] and can be folded and stowed in a forward position negating the need to remove the bipod before placing the rifle into the canvas carrying case. The two legs are held close together with a J-shaped clamp attached to one leg and swung over the other leg. Original Soviet/Russian SVD bipods fetch a very high price when they rarely appear on the market.

== Variants ==
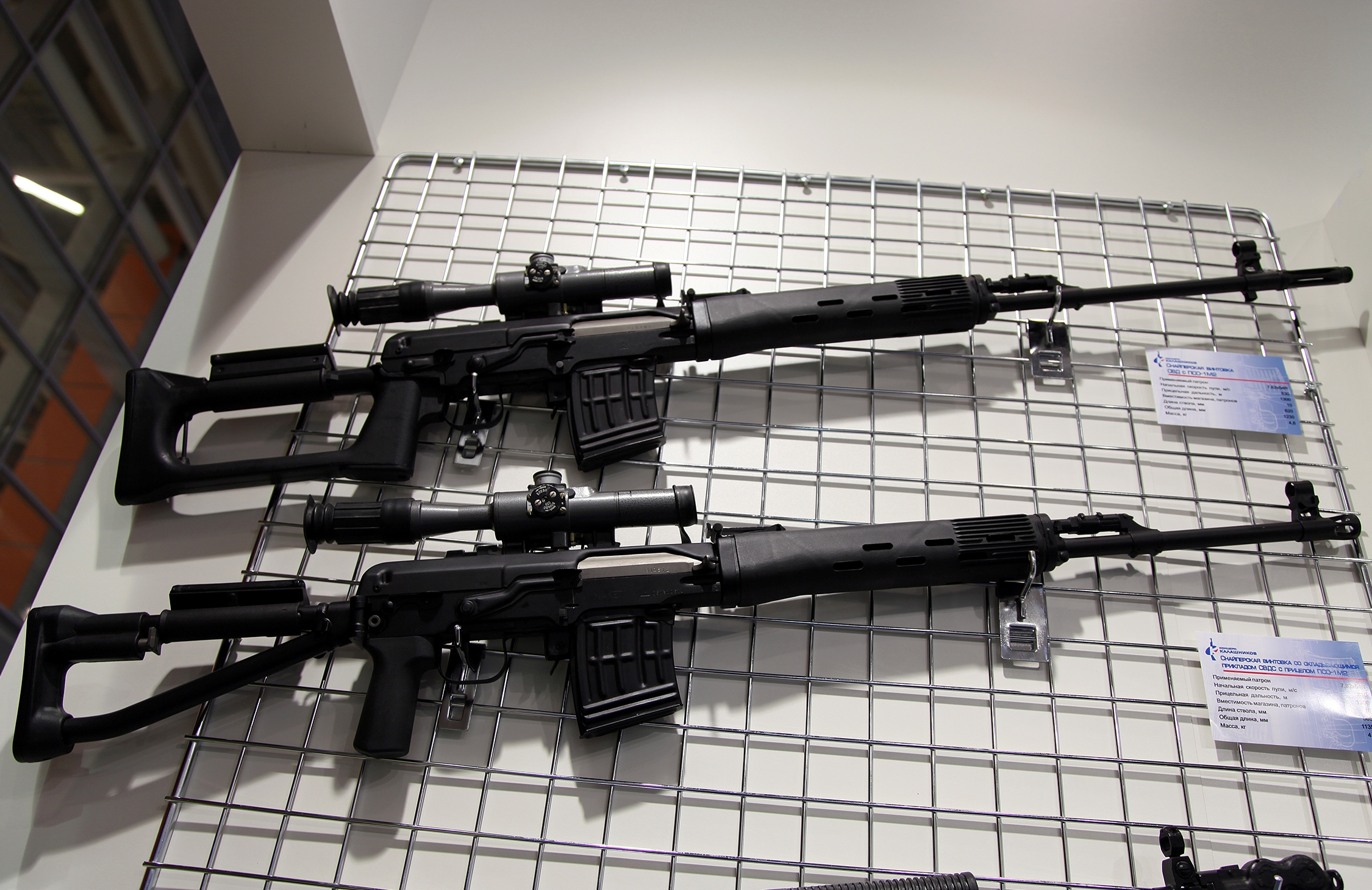
Russian-made SVD (top) and SVDS (shortened variant with folding stock) rifles featuring modern synthetic furniture

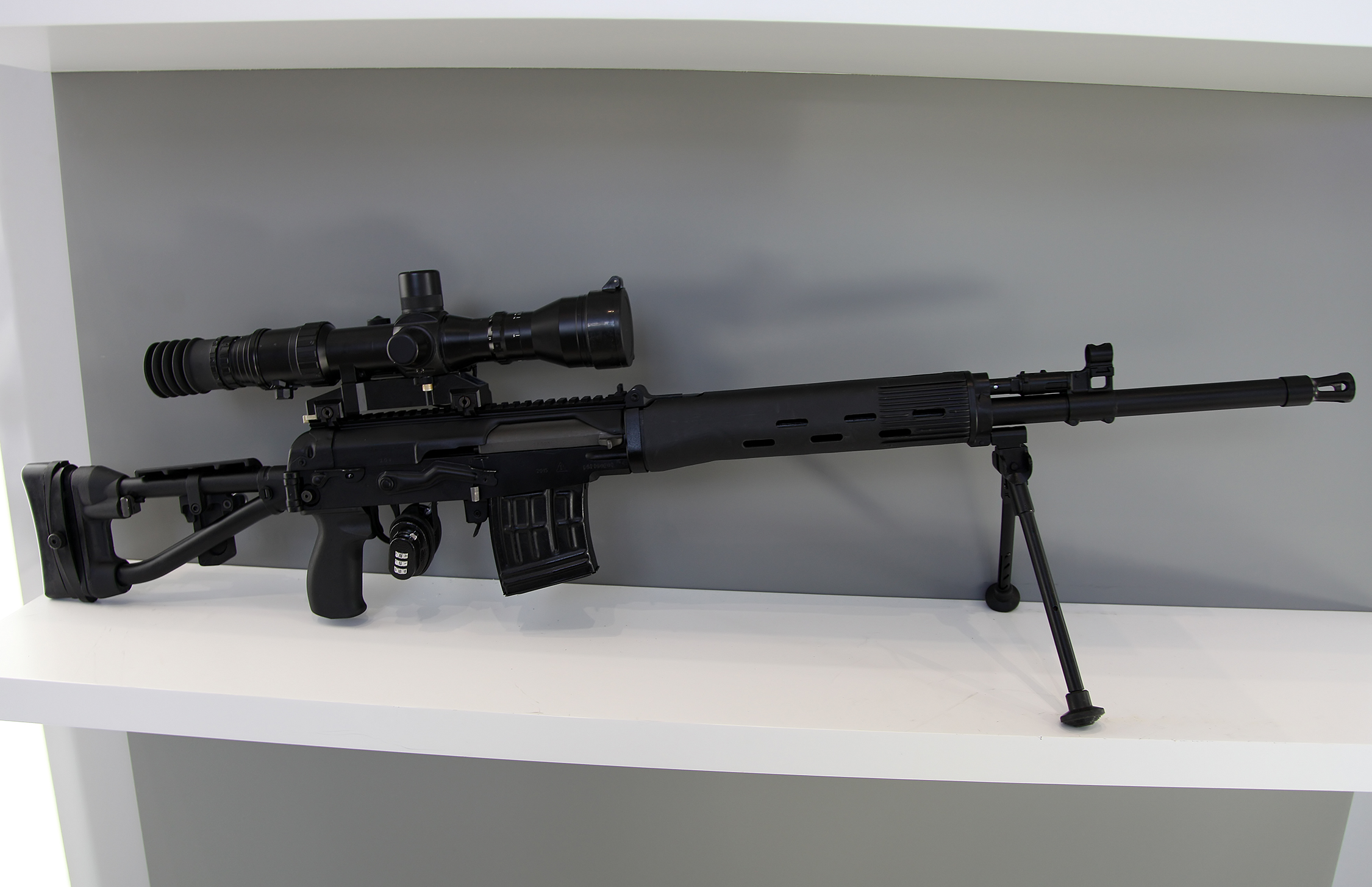
Russian SVDM sniper rifle

- SVDN (6V1N) – A series of variants of the original SVD which were issued with various night vision optics.
- SVDS (6V3) – Attempts to reduce the length of the rifle for use by marines, mechanised infantry, and paratroopers began in 1978 by adding a folding buttstock and a separate pistol grip. Initially, pre-existing stock designs were used (such as the one from the AKS-74), but ergonomic problems necessitated the design of a unique folding stock. The final design was chosen out of a variety of prototypes and adopted in 1995, which had a metal stock that folded to the right as to not be interfered by the optic mount and also had a shortened barrel. The stock included a rubber shoulder pad and cheek riser. The barrel was also given a heavier profile, the receiver housing was strengthened, the gas cylinder block was improved and ported, and a shorter conical flash suppressor was adopted. The SVDSN (6V3N) variants, much like the SVDN variants, are simply equipped with various night vision devices. Production continues as of 2026 at a reportedly greatly increased rate.
- SVD-1990 (SVD-90) – A variant of the SVD with the stock and handguard made from black polymers.
- SVDM – A modernized variant of the SVDS, which entered service in 2018. Compared to its predecessor, the SVDM was notably designed with a thicker (and 550 mm long) barrel, new furniture, and a picatinny rail mount on the new, hinged, dust cover. The variable power 1P88-4 (1П88-4) telescopic sight is used as the standard day optic. The SVDM rifle can be used with a detachable bipod, and with a quick-detachable suppressor. The iron sight line features a simplified rear sight element and a new front sight element located above the gas block. The SVDM has a length of 1,135 mm (44.7 in) (975 mm (38.4 in) with the stock folded) and weighs 5.3 kg (12 lb). A batch was reportedly delivered to an unspecified foreign customer in autumn 2026.
- OTs-03 SVU – A variant of the TKB-0172 which began serial production in 1991 for the MVD. The rifle was also equipped with an improved muzzle brake as well as a rear aperture sight, much like the original SVD prototype. Many were not new production rifles, but instead, retrofitted SVDs. A select-fire variant (OTs-03A(S) SVU-A) was also produced in small quantities to serve as an automatic rifle, but the automatic fire capability was later removed from the design. The original shortened barrel was also later replaced with a full-length barrel in the design.

=== Prototypes ===
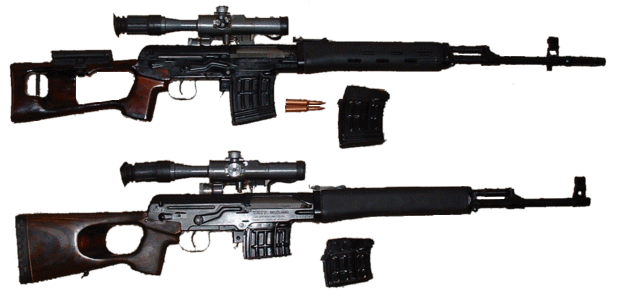
Pair of Dragunovs imported to the U.S. as Tigers. The top rifle has a cheek pad, two 10-round magazines, and a flash suppressor. The bottom rifle was marketed as a hunting "carbine". It has no cheek pad, two 5-round magazines, and no flash suppressor.

- SSV-58 – The prototype submitted to trials by Dragunov. The design lacked the fixed flash hider and bayonet lug, which was added to the rifle prior to adoption. The rear sights were mounted to the dust cover and were aperture sights instead of the standard notch sight.
- TKB-0172 – An early bullpup design of the SVD developed by the Tula Sporting and Hunting Weapons Design Bureau in the 80's. This rifle also had a significantly shortened barrel to reduce length.
- V-70 – A prototype automatic rifle developed in 1968. It involved the development of a new bipod, a thicker and shorter barrel with a new muzzle device, and 15/20-round magazines. The detachable bipod designed for this project would be used in subsequent models of SVD.
- AF – A prototype automatic rifle developed in the mid 70's. The prototypes were chambered in 5.45×39mm and made compatible with AK-74 magazines (specifically, the 45-round magazine also compatible with the RPK-74).
- SVDG (6V1-10) – A smoothbore SVD with a 10 mm bore developed alongside the modern intermediate cartridge program to use the experimental 3 mm APFSDS projectile, originally designed for use in standard machine guns. The design was not implemented due to the projectile's poor terminal ballistics and the complexity of the new weapon.
- SSV-6 (6V1-6) – Chambered in the experimental 6mm cartridge developed in the 80's. The weapon was not adopted due to the cartridge's poor effectiveness.
- SVDK (6V9) – An experimental Russian variant chambered for the 9.3×64mm 7N33 cartridge, based on the civilian Tigr-9 design.

=== Civilian variants ===
- Tigr – A civilian variant of the SVD, lacking a bayonet lug, first produced in the 1970s. Serial production for began in 1992 For export into the United States, the sear which prevented out-of-battery discharge had to be removed to comply with the National Firearms Act. Tiger rifles were available with shortened (520 mm) and full length (620 mm) barrels, different stocks (including an SVDS-style folding stock), and are chambered in 7.62×54mmR, .308 Winchester, .30-06 Springfield or 9.3×64mm Brenneke.
- Kalashnikov TG3 – Civilian variant of the SVD from Kalashnikov Concern, chambered in 9.6×53mm Lancaster, first revealed in 2018. TG3 rifle weighs 3.9 kilograms (8 lb 9.5 oz). The overall length is 1,225 mm (48 inches) with a barrel length of 620 mm (24.4 inches). The TG3 uses five-round single-stack detachable box magazines. The Tg3 is an oval-bore (Lancaster rifling) firearm. Although legally a shotgun, the TG3 is designed to offer rifle-like performance, at least at shorter distances. Russian gun laws restrict rifle ownership for newer gun owners but have far fewer restrictions on shotguns. The TG3 is similar to .366 tkm Ak platform weapons common in the Russian gun market.

=== Foreign variants ===
- SWD-M – A modernised Polish variant of the SVD, which was adopted in 1998 and uses a heavy barrel, bipod (mounted to the forearm) and LD-6 (6×42) telescopic sight.
- Al-Kadesih – An Iraqi variant of the SVD, not to be confused with the Tabuk rifle. Although the design is very similar to the SVD, many parts are not interchangeable due to its unique dimensions and design characteristics. For example, the receiver is not milled and is slightly longer than that of the SVD, and the barrel is pinned to the receiver instead of being threaded. The rifle is also issued magazines with an ornamental palm tree relief.
- Type 79/85 – A Chinese variant of the SVD. Although the design is nearly identical to the original SVD, some parts are not interchangeable, as the dimensions are slightly different from Soviet production rifles. A small quantity were also chambered in .308 Winchester for export. Exported rifles are often referred to as the NDM-86 or EM-351.
- CS/LR19 or NSG-85 – A modernised Chinese variant of the Type 85 adopted by the PLA in 2014.
- SBT-7.62M1 - Vietnamese variant made with polymer handguard, revealed to the public in 2024.

== Doctrine ==
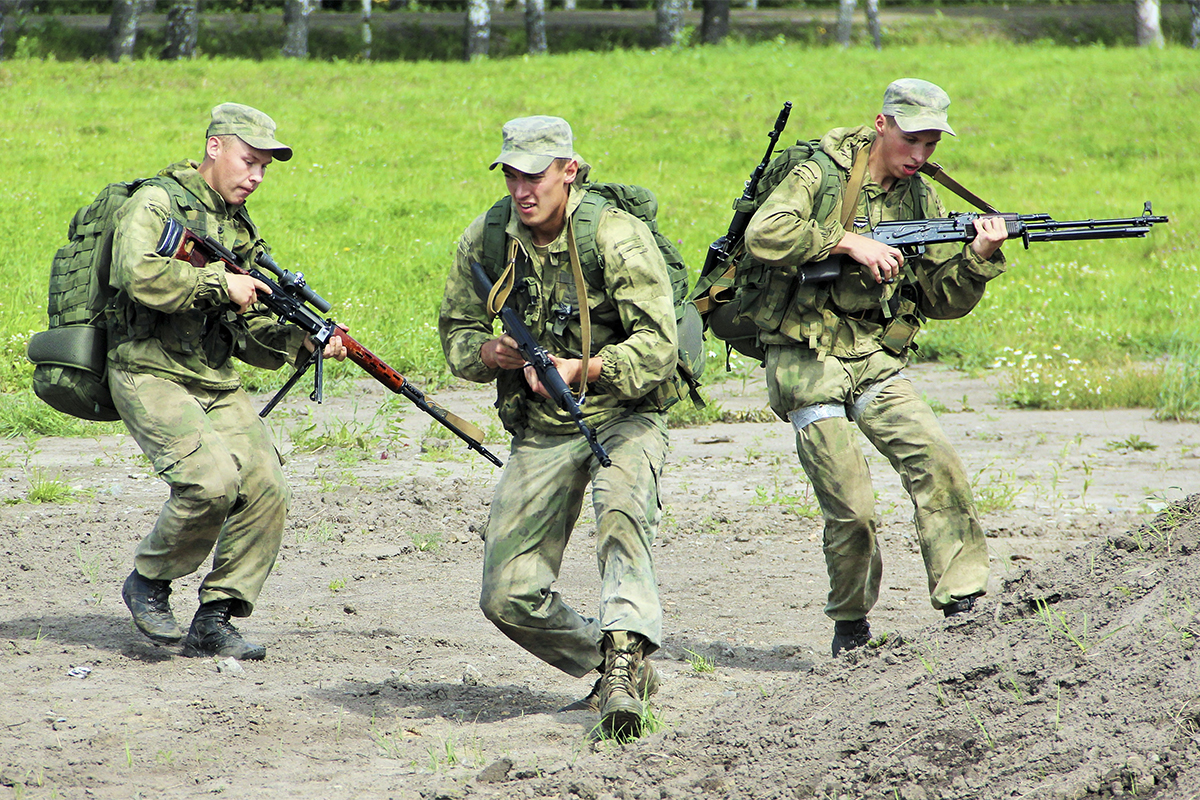
Soldier on the left displaying the clamp-style bipod

The SVD was used by designated marksmen designated in the Soviet Army as snipers at the basic motorized infantry rifle platoon level. For this purpose, the rifle was designed to be much lighter than more conventional precision rifles, making it better suited for use by infantry, and the rifle is autoloading in order to prioritize volume of fire over precision. It was thought that a relatively small number of marksmen armed with 7.62×54mmR fully powered cartridge chambered arms could assist conventional troops armed with 7.62×39mm intermediate cartridge chambered arms by suppressing/harassing valuable targets and assets (such as officers, radio operators, vehicle crews, other marksmen, machine gun teams, anti-tank warfare teams, etc.) with greater precision and at much greater ranges.

Once the rifle had been produced in sufficient numbers, every Warsaw Pact infantry platoon included at least one SVD-equipped marksman. In the German Democratic Republic arsenals, there were almost 1,750. The marksmen were often chosen from personnel who displayed exceptional rifle marksmanship while members of DOSAAF. Such marksmen were estimated to have a 50% probability of hitting a standing, man-sized target at 800 m (875 yd), and an 80% probability of hitting a standing, man-sized target at 500 m (547 yd). To attain this level of accuracy, the sniper could not engage more than two such targets per minute. For distances not exceeding 200 m (219 yd), the probability was estimated to be well above 90% regardless of the time taken.

== Users ==
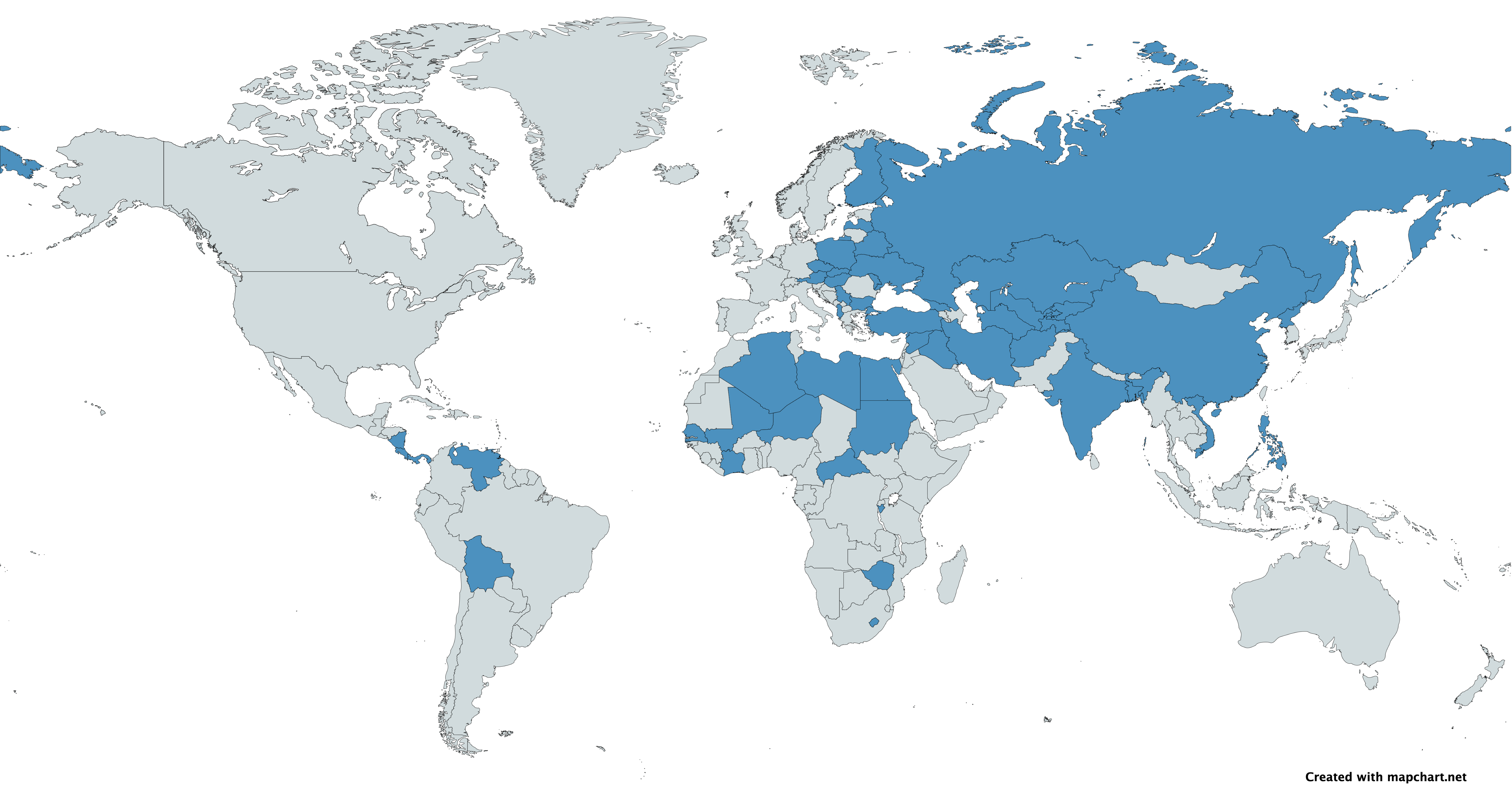
Map with SVD users in blue

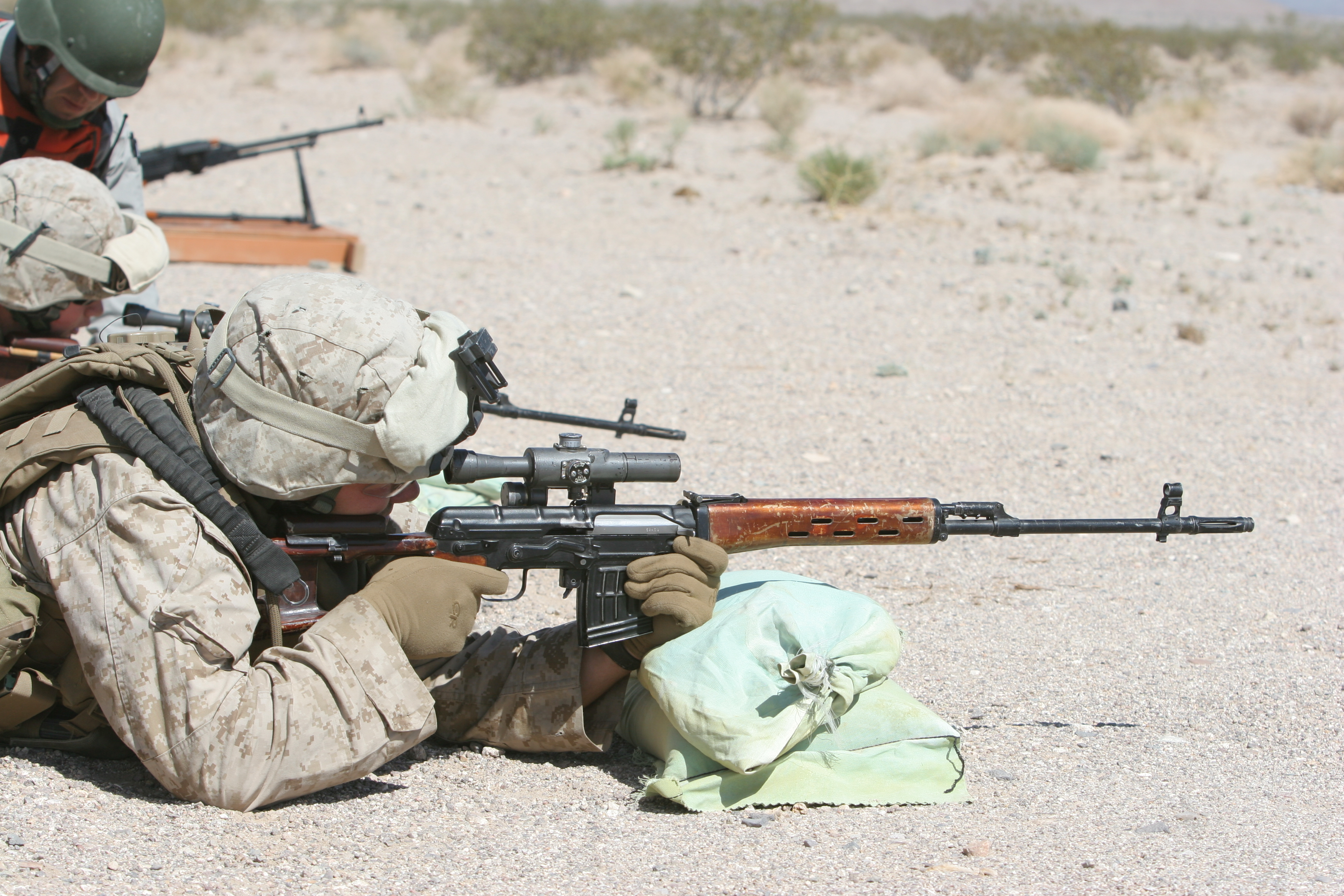
A United States Marine receives instruction on the SVD.

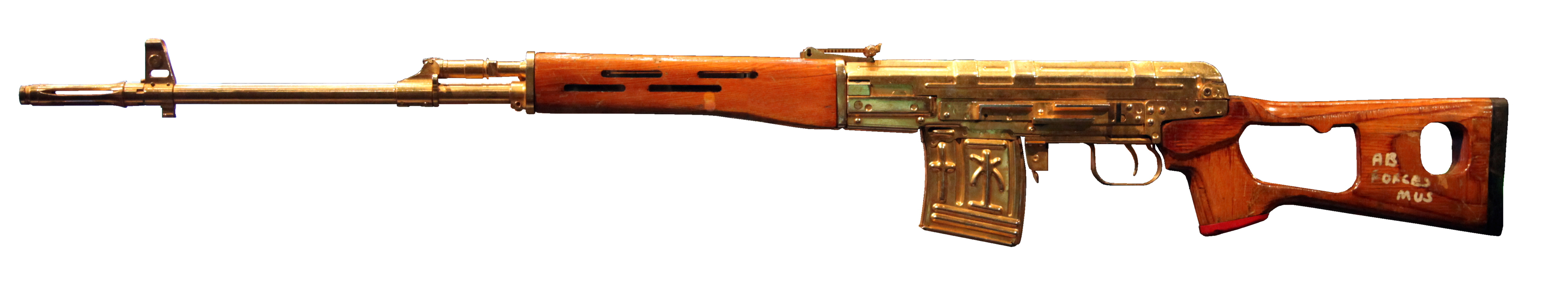
Gold plated Al Kadesiah rifle found in one of Saddam Hussein's palaces, on display at the Parachute Regiment exhibition of the Imperial War Museum in Duxford. Gold-plated Al Kadesiah were a common gift for VIPs of the Ba'athist-era Iraqi regime. The Nakhjir (Hoshdar), Iranian variant of the SVD, being delivered to the 55th Airborne Brigade in Iran.

- Afghanistan: used by the Afghan National Army and Taliban
- Algeria
- Albania
- Austria
- Bangladesh: Uses Chinese Type 85 variant.
- Azerbaijan
- Belarus
- Bolivia: Type 79 variant in use.
- Burundi: Burundian special forces
- Bulgaria
- Central African Republic: SVD and Type 85
- China: Norinco-made copy of the SVD, known as the Type 79. Equipped with a 4× magnification optical sight which is a copy of the PSO-1. The rifle has a slightly shorter butt. Also produced a modified Type 85 and several other commercial copies of the SVD. An upgraded variant called the CS/LR19 was also debuted. Export variants such as the "NSG-85" were also produced.
- Costa Rica
- Czech Republic Reserve only. Replaced in regular units with the CZ BREN 2 PPS DMR.
- Egypt
- Finland: Known as the 7.62 TKIV Dragunov, which stands for tarkkuuskivääri (sniper rifle).
- Georgia
- Hungary
- India: Used by designated marksmen. Being phased out in favour of newer systems.
- Iran: Locally produced as the Nakhjir 3 Sniper Rifle. A new upgraded version was unveiled during the Muhammad Rasulullah 4 exercises held on 12 December 2016.
- Iraq: Al Kadesiah, made based on SVD and PSL. Official Iraqi designation is either Al-Qadissiya or Al-Gadissiya SVD and Kadesiah rifles has been used by both Saddam's and post-2003 Iraqi Army and by Iraqi insurgents. SVDs are also fielded by the Popular Mobilization Forces.
- Ivory Coast
- Kazakhstan
- Kyrgyzstan
- Mali
- Latvia
- Lesotho
- Libya
- Moldova
- Nicaragua
- Niger: Including Type 85s
- North Korea
- Pakistan: Original Russian made rifles either imported from Russia or captured from the Soviet Union during the Soviet–Afghan War, or smuggled from other countries, with Chinese made models also being in service.
- Philippines: Philippine National Police Type 85 Chinese variant. Philippine Army Soviet/Russian SVD-63 Dragunov donated by Russian Federation in 2016.
- Poland: Polish SVD modernization; known as SWD-M- and updated with a heavier barrel, variable magnification scope and detachable bipod. It's planned to replace SVD with the marksman variant of the FB MSBS Grot.
- Russia: SVD-M and folding-stock SVDS.
- Senegal: Used by Air Force and Army
- Serbia: Special forces, model SVDK.
- Slovakia
- Sudan
- Syria
- Tajikistan
- Turkey: Used by Gendarmerie General Command and Polis Özel Harekat.
- Turkmenistan
- Ukraine
- Uzbekistan
- Venezuela: Over 1,000 rifles purchased by the Army of Venezuela in 2007.
- Vietnam: Used by the Vietnamese Army since the Vietnam War.
- Zimbabwe

=== Former users ===
- Artsakh
- Chechen Republic of Ichkeria
- Czechoslovakia: Entered service with the Czechoslovak Army in the 1970s.
- East Germany: Issued as the SWD.
- Soviet Union: Entered service with the Soviet Army in 1967.
- Panama: Formerly used by the defunct Panama Defense Forces.

=== Non-state users ===
- Islamic State: SVD and Type 79.
- Kurdistan Workers' Party
- Lord's Resistance Army

== Conflicts ==
=== 1970s ===
- Vietnam War
- Communist insurgency in Thailand
- South African Border War
- Lebanese Civil War
- Cambodian–Vietnamese War (1978–1989)
- Sino-Vietnamese War
- Salvadoran Civil War
- Kurdish–Turkish conflict
- Soviet–Afghan War

=== 1980s ===
- 1982 Lebanon War
- South Lebanon conflict (1985–2000)
- Iran–Iraq War
- Insurgency in Jammu and Kashmir

=== 1990s ===
- First Nagorno-Karabakh War
- Transnistria War
- Yugoslav Wars
- Gulf War
- Tajikistani Civil War
- Operation Restore Hope
- Burundian Civil War
- First Chechen War
- Second Chechen War

=== 2000s ===
- War in Afghanistan (2001–2021)
- Iraq War
- War in Northwest Pakistan
- Boko Haram insurgency

=== 2010s ===
- 2011 Libyan Civil War
- Mali War
- Syrian Civil War
- War in Iraq (2013–2017)
- Russo-Ukrainian War
  - War in Donbas
  - Russian invasion of Ukraine
- Yemeni Civil War (2014–present)
- Saudi–Yemeni border conflict (2015–present)

=== 2020s ===
- Second Nagorno-Karabakh War
- Tigray War
- Russian-Ukrainian war
- Gaza war
- 2025 Cambodia-Thailand conflict

== See also ==
- SVDK a variant of the SVD, chambered in 9.3×64mm Brenneke.
- VSS Vintorez, a suppressed sniper rifle also used in limited numbers in Russia, similar weapon.
- M21 Sniper Weapon System, an American designated marksman/sniper rifle put in service in 1968, chambered in 7.62×51mm NATO.
- Puşca Semiautomată cu Lunetă (PSL), a Romanian designated marksman/sniper rifle that resembles the SVD, chambered in 7.62×54mmR.
- PSL (rifle).
- Zastava M76, a Yugoslavian designated marksman/sniper rifle that resembles the SVD, chambered in 7.92×57mm Mauser.
- Zastava M91, a Serbian designated marksman/sniper rifle that resembles the SVD, chambered in 7.62×54mmR.
- IMI Galatz, an Israeli designated marksman/sniper rifle that resembles the SVD, chambered in 7.62×51mm NATO.

== Bibliography ==
- McNab, Chris (2023). The SVD Dragunov Rifle. Bloomsbury Publishing. ISBN 978-1-4728-5599-2.
- Galeotti, Mark (20 December 2014). Russia's Wars in Chechnya 1994–2009. Bloomsbury Publishing. ISBN 978-1-78200-278-9.
