= Athi people =

Ethnic group living near Mount Kenya

The Athi (sing. Mwathi, pl. A-Athi) were an ethnic group who lived around Mount Kenya up to and during the eighteenth and possibly nineteenth centuries. Many of their traditions have been captured among the Meru and Kikuyu people of Kenya. According to Meru traditions, the Athi were predated in their areas of occupation by the Agumba people.

== History ==
=== Settlement ===
According to Meru traditions recorded by Fadiman, the period of entry onto Mount Kenya is recalled as the time of ax and fire-stick. As the hunters ventured into the forest zone, each "Mwathi...marked of a specific hunting region, often adjacent to that of hunter neighbors from other clans. Using 'ax, red clay, and fire-stick' to stake his claim". The hunters then progressed 'west' (uphill) into the forest in search of both meat and honey, making sure to remain within their self selected boundaries.

Meru traditions aver that the forest hunters of this era were armed, "only with small bows, axes and iron knives". They "declare that no forest hunter of this era used either shield or spear. Instead they relied on magic to protect them...".

== Way of life ==
=== Subsistence ===
Traditions recorded by Fadiman (1994) portray the Athi as hunters. A common reference to meat and honey point to these being the Athi staples.

=== Shelter ===
In both Meru and Kikuyu traditions, the Athi are remembered as forest dwellers. Athi traditions recorded in Meru, i.e. "the more permanent hunting encampments", indicate that the Athi were partly mobile and lived in a hunting camp setup.

=== Arms ===
According to Athi traditions captured in Meru, the Athi were armed with small bows, axes and iron knives when they first ventured into the montane forest at the base of Mount Kenya.

=== Trade ===
The Athi of Kikuyu tradition traded meat and skins for agricultural products from their neighbors.

== Land use rights ==
According to Meru tradition, the Athi demarcated hunting zones and defined them as belonging to a hunter or clan. These zones were demarcated using a 'fire-stick'.

During the 1700s, the 'fire-stick' demarcation system appears to have been fused with the cursing rituals of the Agumba resulting in a witchcraft ritual known as 'Ndindi', essentially a stick which was curved with clan markings and smeared with bright red-ochre to enhance visibility. This stick was 'communally cursed' then used to demarcate the hunting zones of the using community.

In Kikuyu tradition, the Athi are recalled as having sold the Kikuyu land in the Kabete region. They were partially assimilated into this community and as late as 1983, groups of Athi were thought to be resident in the Rift Valley region of Kenya.

=== Diaspora ===
The Athi are in some accounts associated with the Okiek people.
