= Yaaku people =

Ethiopian and Kenyan people

The Yaaku are a people who are said to have lived in regions of southern Ethiopia and central Kenya, possibly through to the 18th century. The language they spoke is today called Yaakunte. The Yaaku assimilated a hunter-gathering population, whom they called Mukogodo, when they first settled in their place of origin and the Mukogodo adopted the Yaakunte language. However, the Yaaku were later assimilated by a food producing population and they lost their way of life. The Yaakunte language was kept alive for sometime by the Mukogodo who maintained their own hunter-gathering way of life. However, they were later immersed in Maasai culture and adopted the Maa language and way of life. The Yaakunte language is today facing extinction but is undergoing a revival movement. In the present time, the terms Yaaku and Mukogodo (sometimes Mukogodo Maasai), are used to refer to a population living in Mukogodo forest west of Mount Kenya.

== Etymology ==
The name Yaaku is said to be a Southern Nilotic term for hunting people while Mukogodo is a Yaakunte word meaning people who live in rocks.

== History ==
=== Origins ===
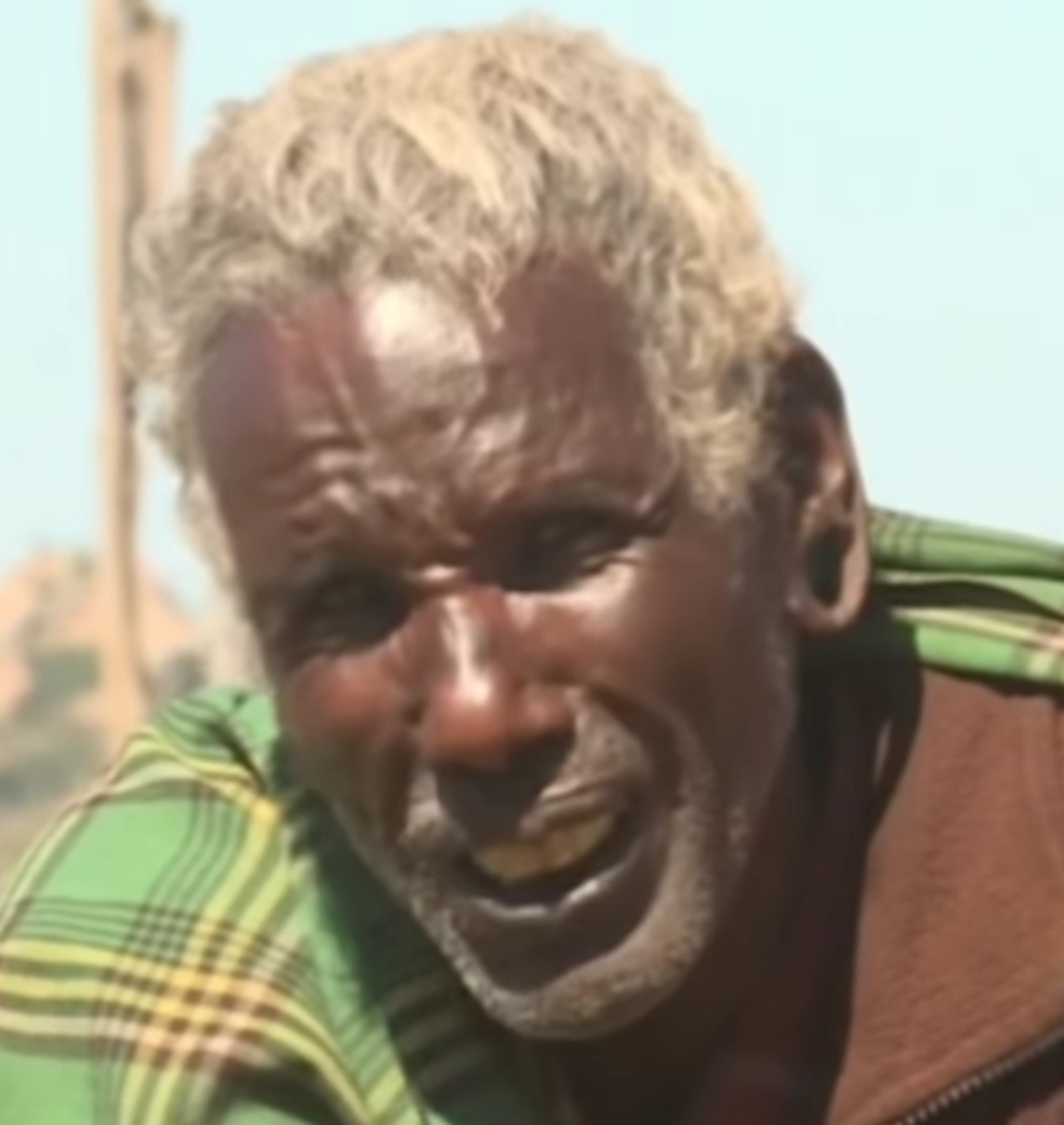
Yaaku elder from Kenya

According to Mukogodo traditions recorded by Mhando (2008), the Yaaku speakers moved into Kenya from southern Ethiopia. At this time they were herders and cultivators In this regard, the narratives are congruent with linguistic reconstruction of the history of the Yaakunte speakers. According to linguist Christopher Ehret (1982), the presumed movements of the Eastern Cushities begin with an entry into East Africa at a point in northeast Uganda. From here they moved "into northern and eastern Kenya as far south as Mt. Kenya. Their modern representatives are the Yaaku hunters who live on the northern slopes of Mt. Kenya". Other present day representatives of the Eastern Cushities that Ehret notes include, "the Arbore and Dasanech herders and cultivators in the Lake Turkana/Chew Bahir (Lake Stephanie) region; and the Elmolo fishermen of east Turkana".

== Way of life ==
When the Yaaku community first entered the territory they would occupy, they met a people who mostly lived by hunting and gathering. However they distinguished themselves from this population by means of residence. This community lived in caves and the Yaaku came to call them Mukogodo, a name which means people who live in rocks in Yaakunte.

=== Subsistence ===
Traditions recorded by Mhando portray the Yaaku as having been herders and cultivators when they first settled.

== Mukogodo assimilation ==
The Mukogodo in whose localities the Yaaku settled, adopted the language of the Yaaku, referred to as Yaakunte.

== Yaaku identity decline ==
The broad Mukogodo understanding of the decline of Yaaku identity is that the speakers were assimilated by another food producing people, a process that happened over a long period of time. During this period, the Yaaku speaking Mukogodo maintained their way of life and the Yaakunte language.

Certain traditions however, relate the decline of Yaaku identity to a specific period which included conflict;

The beginning of the end of Yaaku culture is attributed to the tribal conflicts between the Yaaku and their neighbors which led to the killings of many Yaaku people. The few who had remained disintegrated and settled in blocks according to families and clans within specific territories.
A war broke out a few years later between the Yaaku and Ameru at a place called Oldoinyo esarge, or blood hill where hundreds of Yaaku were killed. Within the same time, the Ilturjo from the north riding on horses (nyumbui) attacked the Yaaku, further killing many of them...

— Mhando, 2008

Fadiman (1997) recorded Meru traditions that also give an account of this conflict, which they relate occurred with a community recalled as Muoko. According to the traditions, conflict with the Muoko community had been ongoing for "decades". However, a notable period of intense Tigania pressure brought the Muoko within raiding range of the Il Tikirri (recalled in Tigania as Ngiithi) and Mumunyot (recalled as Rimunyo) communities.

The Ngiithi and Rimunyo communities began to raid the Muoko from the north at the same time that Tiganian pressure intensified in the south. Consequently, Muoko communities gradually disintegrated as their herds were seized and absorbed by former foes. These traditions particular of later stages, deal primarily with the seizure of Muoko children for Meru homesteads or the adoption of captive Muoko warriors into Tiganian clans...

— J.Fadiman, 1994

Fadiman postulates that the absorption of former foes may have therefore significantly modified Tigania institutions and, indirectly, those of adjacent Meru regions as well.

== Yaaku language decline ==
The Mukogodo assimilated to the pastoralist culture of the Maasai in the first half of the twentieth century (1920s and 1930s), although some still keep bees. The reason for this transition is mostly one of social prestige. The Maasai look down upon hunter-gatherer peoples, calling them Dorobo ('the ones without cattle'), and many Mukogodo consider the Maasai culture superior to their own.

=== Adoption of Maasai language ===
As a result of the decision to transition to pastoralism, the Mukogodo largely gave up their Cushitic language Yaaku for the Eastern Nilotic Maasai language between 1925 and 1936.

=== Yaakunte revival ===
- Yaaku language, for details of the language and revival movement

== Yaaku today ==
In the present time, both the terms Yaaku and Mukogodo, sometimes Mukogodo Maasai are used to refer to a population living in Mukogodo forest west of Mount Kenya.

== See also ==
- Ngaa people
- Dorobo
- Language shift

== Bibliography ==
- Brenzinger, Matthias (1992) 'Lexical retention in language shift', in Brenzinger, Matthias (ed.) Language Death: Factual and Theoretical Explorations with Special Reference to East Africa. Berlin/New York: Mouton de Gruyter, 213–254.
- Cronk, Lee (2002) 'From true Dorobo to Mukogodo-Maasai: contested ethnicity in Kenya', Ethnology, 41(1), 27–49.
- Heine, Bernd (1974/75) 'Notes on the Yaaku language (Kenya)', Afrika und Übersee, 58(1), 27–61; 58(2), 119–138.
- Heine, Bernd & Brenzinger, Matthias (1988) 'Notes on the Mukogodo dialect of Maasai', Afrikanistische Arbeitspapiere, 14, 97–131.
- Mous, Maarten & Stoks, Hans & Blonk, Matthijs (2005) 'De laatste sprekers' [the last speakers], in Indigo, tijdschrift over inheemse volken [journal on indigenous peoples], pp. 9–13.See article The last speakers
- Sommer, Gabriele (1992) 'A survey on language death in Africa', in Brenzinger, Matthias (ed.) Language Death: Factual and Theoretical Explorations with Special Reference to East Africa. Berlin/New York: Mouton de Gruyter, 301–417.
