= Murutu people =

Swahili community

The Murutu people were a community that, according to the oral literature of the Meru people of Kenya, inhabited regions of the Swahili coast and the Kenyan hinterland at various times in history.

== Origins ==
According to Meru traditions, the Meru people originally lived on an island recalled as Mbwaa or Mbwa. They were later driven out of the island, forcing them to move into the Kenyan hinterland.

== Contact with Cushitic communities ==
Meru tradition states that they met Cushitic speaking communities while on their migratory journey. The descriptions of these communities have been matched with present identity realities and contemporary understanding of regional history to show that they bear elements of historicity.

=== Yaaku ===
In the narratives of various Meru informants, contact with a Cushitic community occurred even before they got to Mount Kenya. This community is referred to in various regions as Ukara, Ukara and Muoko, Ikara or Agira and Mwoko. In Mwimbi, they are referred to as Ukara while in Tigania they are known as Muoko. The totality of traditions indicate that these communities belonged to one or more sections of the Oromo-speaking peoples i.e. Borana (previously identified as Galla), Oromo etc. Traditions of the Mukogodo identify this community as Yaaku.

Traditions in each region describe the 'Ukara' et al. as having "buried their dead in a sitting position, covering each grave with stones". This was confirmed by an early colonial administrator who uncovered several alleged 'Muoko' graves, pointed out to him by Meru elders, which substantiated the practice of burial in a sitting position. A Methodist missionary would later note the similarity between the 'Muoko' burials and those still practiced by the Tana River Galla.

=== Mukogodo ===
Meru folklore indicates that the Galla were linked to groups of forest hunters. This community is variously referred to as Mukoko, Mukuru, Mukuguru, Aruguru and in one region Mu-Uthiu. In Mwimbi, the forest hunters were called Mukoko or Mukuru and were linked to livestock-owning Ukara while Tiganians describe Mukuguru (or Aruguru) as allied to the Muoko herders of their region. Tradition states that this community subsisted through hunting and trade with their neighbors. Existing evidence suggests that these names are variants of Mukogodo, a contemporary Ogiek people, whose original language was part of the Cushitic cluster.

== c.1730s ==
=== Interaction with Cushitic communities ===
Tradition states that both Ukara and Mokogodo fled the slopes of Mount Kenya soon after the migrants arrived. Unable to defend themselves, they are said to have "turned into birds and flown away."

=== Murutu identity ===
According to Meru oral literature, the Murutu identity formed following a period known as Igaironi. Fadiman states that this was "perhaps in the late 1730s".

=== Murutu fragmentation ===
During the Igaironi period, another community known as the Muku-Ngaa had also formed. Both these sections are said to have moved in their traditional direction of march. At a point that tradition places near today's Ntugi Hill, however, they fragmented once more. The Murutu appear to have divided into three smaller sections.

- One, retaining the name, remained on the plain to become part of the contemporary Tharaka.
- A second group moved westward toward Mount Kenya, eventually reaching the mountain base at the modern region of Mwimbi.
- The third segment pressed north into a then heavily wooded plain, known today as Tigania.

== c.1830 ==
=== Interaction with Muoko ===
Tiganian narrations of the Mukuruma age-set, describe how men sent ahead of the migrants to examine the Tigania plain, returned to describe an entire "sea of grass filled with few people and many cows". The narratives portray a memorable instance of conflict on contact with the community on the Tigania plain;

To fulfill the prophecy that had sent them westward since the migration's beginning, their prophets ordered them to seize the herds. As the narration is retold today, Tiganian warriors took the Muoko by surprise, seizing "four great herds" in an initial skirmish, then moved livestock, women, children, and the aged into a single, defensible camp. The Muoko, perhaps initially outnumbered, reacted by barring the intruders from both water and salt, systematically burying salt licks and springs to prevent their discovery and use. The Muoko also had stabbing spears, a weapon Tiganians could not forge. They responded with bow and arrow, ambushing Muoko herders in the long grass ("they crept like rats" sang the Muoko of their foes) and stampeding their herds.

— Fadiman, 1994

Meru tradition states that this period was followed by "decades" of war though Fadmian suggests that there was a time of dry-season raiding on both sides. During this period, the Tiganians mastered the art of forging spears. Thereafter, the Muoko found themselves forced steadily into the arid northeast away from the fertile grassland region.
