= HMS Maidstone (1937) =

1937 British submarine depot ship

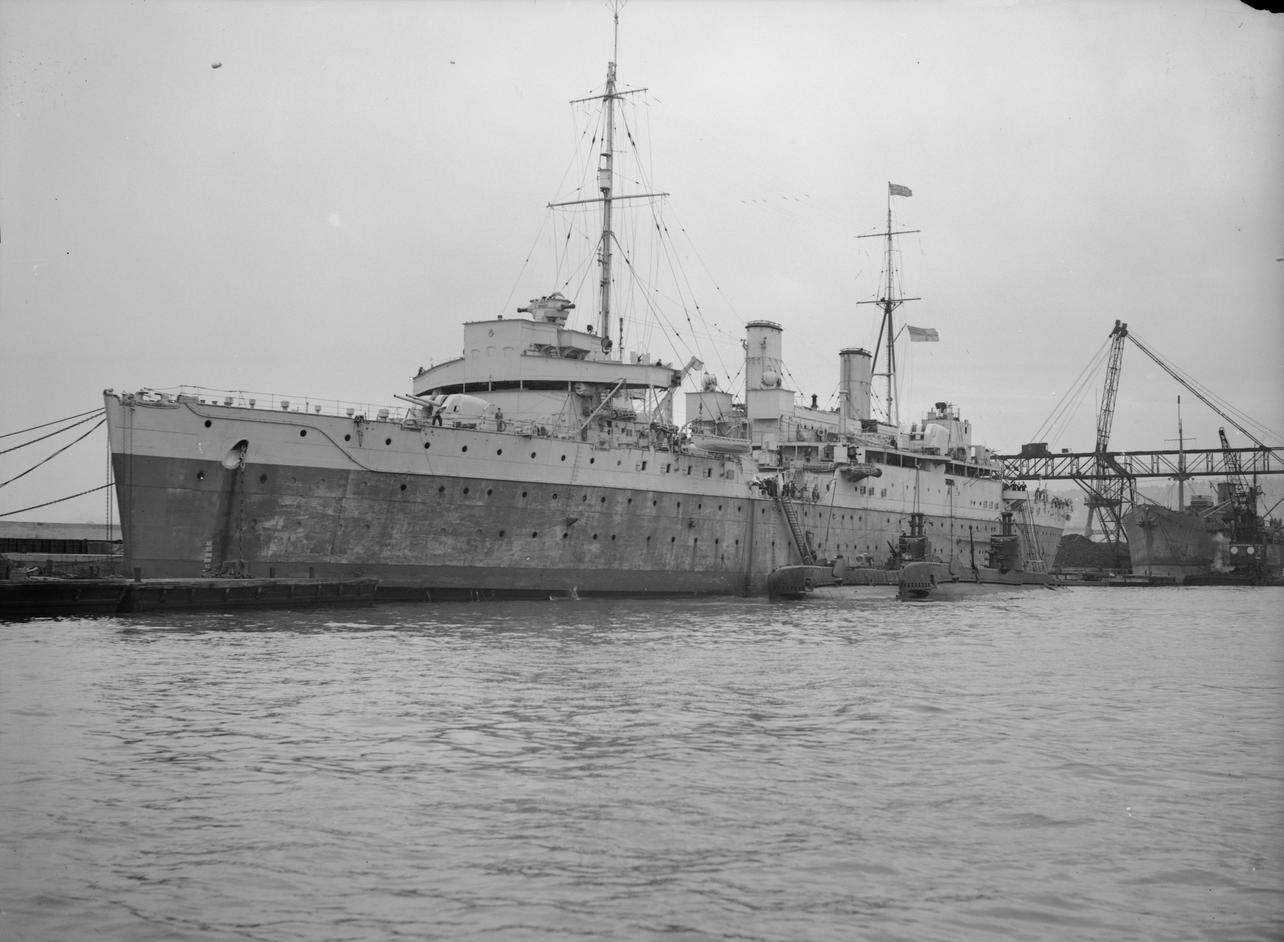
- HMS Maidstone in the harbour of Algiers. Alongside are HMS Safari and HMS Sahib

History

United Kingdom
- Name: HMS Maidstone
- Namesake: Maidstone, Kent
- Builder: John Brown & Company - Clydebank
- Laid down: 17 August 1936
- Launched: 21 October 1937
- Commissioned: 5 May 1938
- Reclassified: Internment Holding area, 1970s
- Fate: Scrapped May 1978

General characteristics
- Type: Submarine depot ship
- Displacement: 8,900 tons
- Length: 497 ft (151 m)
- Beam: 73 ft (22 m)
- Speed: 17 knots (31 km/h; 20 mph)
- Complement: 1,167 men
- Armament: 8 × 4.5 in (110 mm) DP guns (4×2); 8 × 2-pounder AA guns (2×4)

HMS Maidstone was a submarine depot ship of the Royal Navy. She operated in the Mediterranean Sea, Indian Ocean and Pacific Ocean during the Second World War. She was later used as a barracks ship and then a prison ship in Northern Ireland.

== Facilities ==
She was built to support the increasing number of submarines, especially on distant stations, such as the Mediterranean Sea and the Pacific Far East. Her equipment included a foundry, coppersmiths, plumbing and carpentry shops, heavy and light machine shops, electrical and torpedo repair shops and plants for charging submarine batteries. She was designed to look after nine operational submarines, supplying over 100 torpedoes and a similar number of mines. Besides large workshops, there were repair facilities for all materiel in the attached submarines and extensive diving and salvage equipment was carried. There were steam laundries, a cinema, hospital, chapel, two canteens, a bakery, barber shop, and a fully equipped operating theatre and dental surgery.

== Career ==
=== Second World War ===
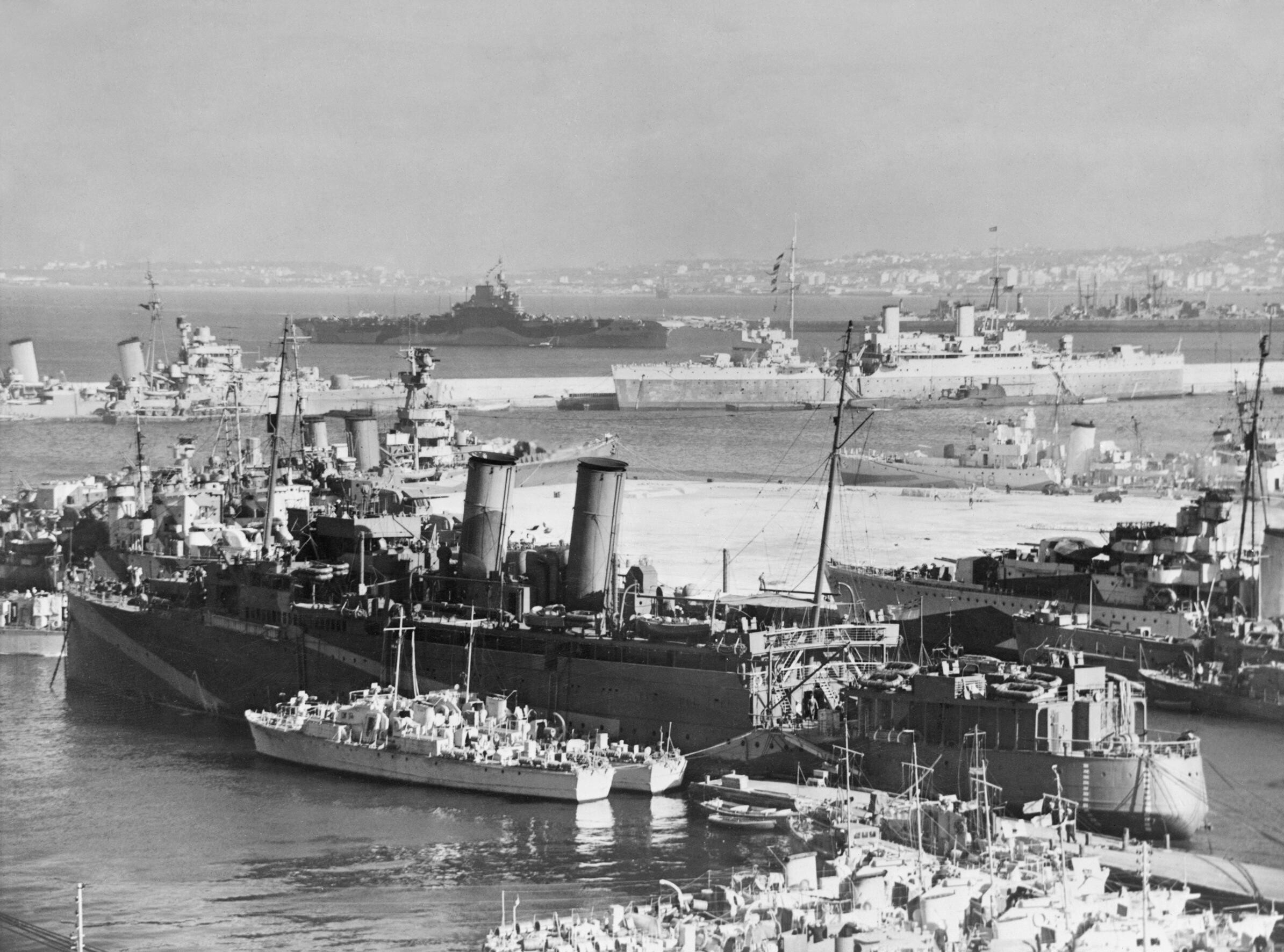
Maidstone in Algiers Harbour

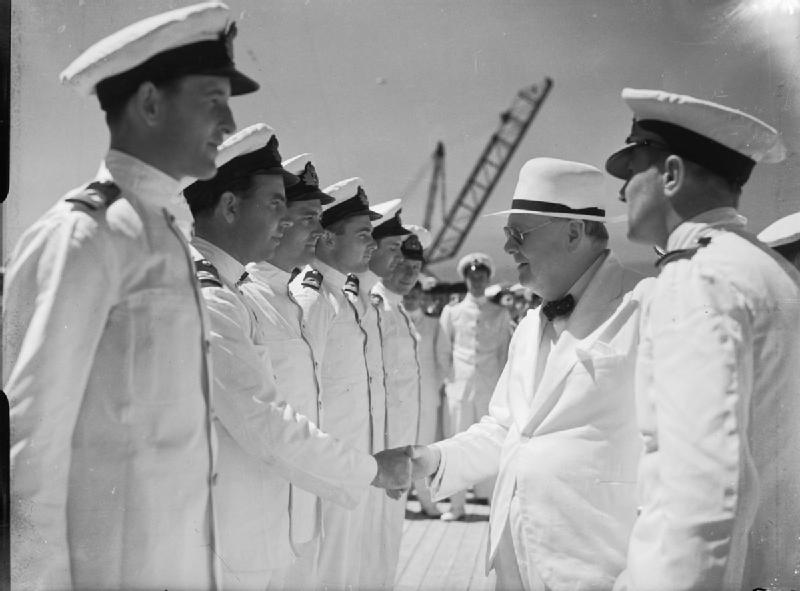
Winston Churchill meets submarine commanders in Algiers aboard Maidstone during the War

In September 1939 Maidstone was depot ship to the ten submarines of the 1st Submarine Flotilla. In March 1941 she went to Gibraltar. From November 1942, Maidstone was based at Algiers Harbour, the main Allied base in the Mediterranean. In November 1943 she was assigned to the Eastern Fleet. In September 1944 Maidstone and the 8th Submarine Flotilla were transferred from Ceylon to Fremantle in Western Australia to operate in the Pacific.

In late 1945 Maidstone left Fremantle, and en route to the UK, docked in the Selborne dry dock at Simonstown, South Africa. While on passage, she was diverted to Macassar to pick up 400 British naval prisoners of war from HMS Exeter, HMS Encounter and HMS Stronghold. In November 1945, she arrived at Portsmouth.

During the war Maidstone was adopted by the Borough of Maidstone as part of Warship Week. The plaque from this adoption is held by the National Museum of the Royal Navy in Portsmouth.

=== Postwar ===
In 1946 Maidstone became mother ship to the 2nd and 7th Submarine Flotillas. The 2nd Flotilla comprised operational boats, the latter a trials and training squadron. Maidstone had a semi-permanent mooring off Monkey Island (Portland) but often put to sea with its subsidiary ships. In 1951 Maidstone called briefly at Corunna to land a sick crewman. This was not classified an official visit, although it was the first time a British warship had entered a Spanish harbour since the end of the Spanish Civil War. In 1953, she took part in the Fleet Review to celebrate the Coronation of Queen Elizabeth II.

On 16 June 1955 the submarine HMS Sidon sank in Portland harbour alongside Maidstone 20 minutes after an explosion in the forward torpedo compartment. A rescue party from Maidstone saved a number of the Sidon's crew, but 13 died. A week later, the submarine was raised and the accident was found to be caused by the high-test peroxide fuel in a torpedo. Surgeon Lieutenant Charles Rhodes was posthumously awarded the Albert Medal for his part in the rescue.

In 1956 Maidstone was the flagship of the Commander-in-Chief, Home Fleet. In September 1957, the Soviet Union protested when Maidstone accompanied the training aircraft carrier HMS Ocean on a visit to Helsinki. In 1959 Maidstone received an extensive refit to accommodate nuclear submarines and the 2nd Flotilla was then moved to Devonport. In 1961 Maidstone sailed to Faslane, on Gareloch, where she was the depot ship to the 3rd and 10th Submarine Squadrons. In 1965, she undertook a trip to Liverpool, and she visited the same port one year later. She also undertook a trip to Rothesay during this period and then, in 1968, she sailed to Rosyth Dockyard to undertake preparations to permanently retire her. The Norwegian navy considered buying her, as did HM Prison Service, who decided the facilities onboard, having been used by many hundreds of sailors, were only suitable for 50 or so prisoners.

=== Belfast ===
In October 1969 Maidstone was refitted and re-commissioned as accommodation for 2,000 troops and sent to Belfast. In 1969, she arrived under tow at Belfast to serve as barracks for the increased security forces in the area. In 1971, she was used as a prison ship in Operation Demetrius as a place to hold internees without trial, including Gerry Adams. The holding area itself was at the stern and consisted of two bunkhouses, one up, one down, and two mess rooms. Above these were the rooms of the governor and his staff (previously the captain's cabin) and above this was the deck, used twice a day for exercise. The deck was surrounded by 10-foot (3.0 m)-high barbed wire. She was moored in the Herdman Channel in Belfast harbour, 20 feet (6.1 m) from the land, entry to the jetty being guarded by sand-bagged army emplacements. HMS Hartland Point, a Beachy Head-class repair ship, was initially moored in front of Maidstone and cables connecting the smaller ship to the bow of Maidstone were used as part of the escape of seven Provisional IRA members on 17 January 1972 which made the headlines. The men swam close to 300 yd (270 m) through icy water across Belfast Lough and hijacked a bus. Having evaded the army and police, the men later held a press conference. The escape was a major embarrassment to the authorities. On 9 April 1972 all internees were moved to Long Kesh prison (HM Prison Maze).

The presence of the ship in Belfast Harbour drew attention to the constitutional status of Northern Ireland's territorial waters, which had long been a point of contention with the Irish government. By early 1975 the ship remained at Sydenham Wharf in Belfast as part of the Royal Naval Operation in Northern Ireland, to provide immediate short-notice accommodation for the Army, should significant reinforcements be required and to provide ad-hoc accommodation for UK Service Personnel visiting the Province.

=== Fate ===
On 23 May 1978, Maidstone was broken up for scrap at the Thos. W. Ward scrapyard in Inverkeithing. The ship's bell is now located at Maidstone Grammar School, where it is rung to signify the start of assembly.

== See also ==
- HMS Al Rawdah (1911)
- HMS Argenta
- HMS Medway (F25)

== Publications ==
- Colledge, J. J.; Warlow, Ben (2006) [1969]. Ships of the Royal Navy: The Complete Record of All Fighting Ships of the Royal Navy from the 15th Century to the Present (3rd Rev ed.). London: Chatham Publishing. ISBN 978-1-86176-281-8. OCLC 67375475.
