= Explorer-class submarine =

1958 class of British submarines

- Explorer-class submarine (HMS Explorer (S30))

Class overview
- Builders: Vickers-Armstrongs, Barrow-in-Furness
- Preceded by: Amphion class
- Succeeded by: Porpoise class
- Cost: £2,000,000
- In commission: 1958–1965
- Completed: 2

General characteristics
- Type: Submarine
- Displacement: 780 tons surfaced; 1,000 tons submerged
- Length: 54 m (178 ft)
- Beam: 4.78 m (15 ft 8 in)
- Draught: 3.4 m (11 ft)
- Propulsion: High Test Peroxide (HTP) steam raising plant driving steam turbines (submerged); Diesel-electric (surfaced); 2 shafts
- Speed: 46 km/h (25 kn) (average submerged, 30 knots peak)
- Complement: 49

The two Explorer-class submarines were experimental vessels built for the Royal Navy to test a propulsion system based on the use of highly concentrated hydrogen peroxide (high-test peroxide, HTP) and diesel fuel to achieve high underwater endurance and speeds.

Germany had started experimenting with this technology early in the Second World War and developed it into the Walter cycle. They had built some experimental boats. One of these, the Type XVII U-1407 U-boat submarine, which had been scuttled at the end of the war, was salvaged and eventually recommissioned into the Royal Navy as HMS Meteorite.

This eventually led to the construction of the two Explorer-class experimental submarine boats, which used steam turbines, the steam being generated using heat from the catalysed interaction of HTP and diesel oil. They used the Porpoise-class hull, modified with retractable superstructure fittings to help streamlining. Being purely experimental craft they had no torpedo tubes or radar fitted, only one periscope and were equipped with backup diesel engines to recharge the batteries and propel them on the surface.

The first, Excalibur, was commissioned in March 1958. They were very fast boats, achieving a peak speed of over 30 knots, a speed record at the time for a submarine, a sustained underwater speed of around 49 km/h (26.5 kn) for period up to 3 hours, and 22 km/h (12 kn) for 15 hours on one turbine. Because of the use of hydrogen peroxide as a hair bleach, the submarines were nicknamed the Blonde class. As well as providing experience with this type of technology, they also allowed the Royal Navy to practise against fast moving underwater targets. However the use of HTP was not successful, and there were several explosions, which resulted in the second nickname of Exploder being applied to the class and Explorer in particular, while Excalibur had the nickname "Excruciater". The subsequent use of HTP to power torpedoes led to the loss of HMS Sidon and the loss of the Russian submarine Kursk.

When the United States developed a nuclear reactor which could be installed in a submarine, the HTP project was abandoned. It was decided that it was not worth converting the class into normal diesel submarines. As a result, Explorer was sold for £13,500 to Thos. W. Ward for breaking up; Excalibur in turn was also subsequently sold to Thos. W. Ward.

Other countries have since developed the concept of the non-nuclear air-independent propulsion submarine to the point where it is a safe technology albeit as an auxiliary power source to a conventional diesel-electric drive, although hydrogen peroxide has long been abandoned and liquid oxygen is generally now preferred.

== Boats ==
Name	Pennant No.	Builder	Launched	Commissioned	Status
Explorer	S30	Vickers-Armstrongs, Barrow-in-Furness	5 March 1954	28 November 1956	Sold for scrap
Excalibur	S40	Vickers-Armstrongs, Barrow-in-Furness	25 February 1955	26 February 1958	Sold for scrap

== Bibliography ==
- Miller, David; Jordan, John (1987). Modern Submarine Warfare. London: Salamander Books. ISBN 0-86101-317-4.
- Preston, Antony (1995). "United Kingdom". In Chumbley, Stephen (ed.). Conway's All The World's Fighting Ships 1947–1995. Annapolis, Maryland: Naval Institute Press. pp. 95–131. ISBN 1-55750-132-7.
