= Thoden =

Thoden may refer to:

- Bonno Thoden van Velzen (1933–2020), Dutch anthropologist
- Ulrich Thoden (born 1973), German politician

== See also ==
- Thode (disambiguation)
