= HMS Excalibur =

Submarine of the Royal Navy

- HMS Excalibur (S40)

History

United Kingdom
- Name: Excalibur
- Ordered: 26 August 1947
- Builder: Vickers Armstrong
- Launched: 25 February 1955
- Completed: 22 February 1958
- Identification: Pennant number: S40
- Nickname(s): The Excruciator
- Fate: Scrapped, 1968
- Notes: Built at a cost of £1,142,000

General characteristics
- Class & type: Explorer-class submarine
- Displacement: 780 long tons (790 t) (surfaced); 1,000 long tons (1,000 t) (submerged)
- Length: 178 ft (54 m)
- Beam: 15 ft 8 in (4.78 m)
- Draught: 11 ft (3.4 m)
- Propulsion: High Test Peroxide (HTP) steam raising plant driving steam turbines (submerged); Diesel-electric (surfaced); 2 shafts
- Speed: 25 knots (46 km/h; 29 mph) (submerged)
- Complement: 41
- Armament: None

HMS Excalibur was an Explorer-class submarine, the sister ship of HMS Explorer, the only two submarines powered by high-test peroxide (HTP) which were constructed for the Royal Navy. She is the only commissioned ship in the Royal Navy to be named as such, in honour of the sword of Arthurian legend. In 2025, the Royal Navy christened a non-commissioned uncrewed submarine of the same name into service for the purpose of testing unmanned underwater systems.

== Operation ==
Both Excalibur and Explorer were assigned to the 3rd Submarine Squadron. However, due to their experimental nature, they tended to operate independently, accompanied by their depot ship HMS Kingfisher and the fuel carrier RFA Spabeck. They later acted as high-speed underwater targets for the Royal Navy's prototype nuclear-powered submarine HMS Dreadnought.

== Periscope ==
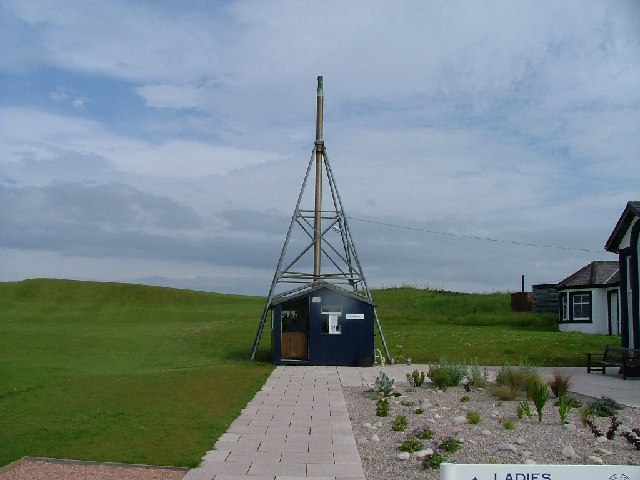
The periscope at the golf course, used to see over an adjacent sand dune and tell if the first green is clear

The submarine's periscope survives. It was installed in the starter's hut at the Golf House Club, the golf club at Elie and Earlsferry, Scotland; players and visitors may use it to view the golf course.

== Bibliography ==
- Colledge, J. J.; Warlow, Ben (2006) [1969]. Ships of the Royal Navy: The Complete Record of All Fighting Ships of the Royal Navy from the 15th Century to the Present (3rd Rev ed.). London: Chatham Publishing. ISBN 978-1-86176-281-8. OCLC 67375475.
- Preston, Antony (1995). "United Kingdom". In Chumbley, Stephen (ed.). Conway's All The World's Fighting Ships 1947–1995. Annapolis, Maryland: Naval Institute Press. pp. 95–131. ISBN 1-55750-132-7.
- Thomas, Steve (November 2022). "Fire and Water: Britain's Fast Submarine Program". Marine News Supplement: Warships. 76 (11): S599–S613. ISSN 0966-6958.
