= RFA Spabeck =

1943 Spa-class coastal water carrier of the Royal Fleet Auxiliary

History

United Kingdom
- Name: Rivulet
- Ordered: September 1941
- Builder: Philip and Son, Dartmouth, Devon
- Laid down: 14 May 1943
- Launched: 21 June 1943
- Commissioned: 3 September 1943
- Decommissioned: March 1966
- Renamed: Spabeck
- Stricken: 1966
- Identification: X19; A227
- Fate: Scrapped, May 1966

General characteristics (as built)
- Class & type: Spa-class water carrier
- Displacement: 1,220 long tons (1,240 t) (full load)
- Length: 172 ft (52.4 m) (o/a)
- Beam: 30 ft (9.1 m)
- Draught: 12 ft (3.7 m) (full load)
- Installed power: 1 cylindrical boiler; 605 ihp (451 kW)
- Propulsion: 1 shaft; 1 triple-expansion steam engine
- Speed: 9 knots (17 km/h; 10 mph)
- Complement: 12
- Armament: 1 × 12 pdr (3 in (76 mm)) gun; 2 × 20 mm (0.8 in) AA guns

RFA Spabeck (A227) was one of six Spa-class coastal water carriers built for the Royal Fleet Auxiliary during the Second World War. During the 1950s she was modified to store high-test peroxide (HTP) for the experimental programme evaluating the feasibility of submarines using HTP operationally. The ship was sold for scrap in 1966.

== Description ==
The Spa-class ships were designed for harbour duties as water carriers. displaced 625 long tons (635 t) at normal load and 1,220 long tons (1,240 t) fully loaded. The ships had an overall length of 172 feet (52.4 m), a beam of 30 feet (9.1 m) and a draught of 12 feet (3.7 m) at deep load. They were powered by a three-cylinder vertical triple-expansion steam engine that drove a single propeller shaft, using steam provided by one cylindrical boiler. The engine developed 605 indicated horsepower (451 kW) and gave a maximum speed of 9 knots (17 km/h; 10 mph). The ships were armed with a single 12-pounder (3 in (76 mm)) gun and two 20-millimeter (0.8 in) Oerlikon AA guns

== Construction and career ==
Spabeck ordered in September 1941 from Philip and Son and was laid down on 14 May 1943 at their Dartmouth, Devon shipyard as Rivulet. The ship was launched on 21 June and commissioned on 3 September as Spabeck. She was modified in 1948 as a HTP tanker to support the experimental submarines Meteorite, Explorer and Excalibur. The ship was fitted with ten high-grade aluminium tanks capable of carrying 110 long tons (110 t) of HTP, 20 long tons (20 t) of distilled water, and 16 long tons (16 t) of sulphur-free AVCAT jet fuel that was injected into the submarine's combustion chamber to increase its output.

After the end of the programme in the early 1960s, Spabeck was laid up at Devonport. She was listed for disposal in January 1966 and put up for sale on 11 March. Purchased by a Belgian shipbreaking company for £10,875, she arrived at Antwerp en route to Willebroek, Belgium, for scrapping on 14 May.

== Bibliography ==
- Colledge, J. J.; Warlow, Ben & Bush, Steve (2020). Ships of the Royal Navy: The Complete Record of all Fighting Ships of the Royal Navy from the 15th Century to the Present (5th revised and updated ed.). Barnsley, UK: Seaforth Publishing. ISBN 978-1-5267-9327-0.
- Lenton, H. T. (1998). British & Empire Warships of the Second World War. Annapolis, Maryland: Naval Institute Press. ISBN 1-55750-048-7.
- Thomas, Steve (November 2022). "Fire and Water: Britain's Fast Submarine Program". Marine News Supplement: Warships. 76 (11): S599–S613. ISSN 0966-6958.
- Wilson, Michael (1981). "The Walter Submarine ~ 2". In Roberts, John (ed.). Warship V. London: Conway Maritime Press. pp. 247–253. ISBN 0-85177-244-7.
