= HMS Explorer (submarine) =

Submarine of the Royal Navy

- HMS Explorer (S30)

History

United Kingdom
- Name: Explorer
- Ordered: 26 August 1947
- Launched: 5 March 1954
- Christened: 28 November 1956
- Identification: Pennant number: S30
- Nickname(s): Exploder
- Fate: Scrapped, February 1965

General characteristics
- Class & type: Explorer-class submarine
- Displacement: 780 long tons (790 t) (surfaced); 1,000 long tons (1,000 t) (submerged)
- Length: 178 ft (54 m)
- Beam: 15 ft 8 in (4.78 m)
- Draught: 11 ft (3.4 m)
- Propulsion: High Test Peroxide (HTP) steam raising plant driving steam turbines (submerged); Diesel-electric (surfaced); 2 shafts
- Speed: 25 knots (46 km/h; 29 mph) (submerged)
- Complement: 41
- Armament: None

HMS Explorer was an Explorer-class submarine, an experimental British submarine based on the captured German high test peroxide (HTP) powered U-boat U-1407. U-1407 had been scuttled following the German collapse at the end of the Second World War, was salvaged and eventually commissioned into the Royal Navy as HMS Meteorite. Her recovery was the impetus for a British research programme which resulted in the construction of two experimental submarines, HMS Explorer and HMS Excalibur. Built for speed trials, they were unarmed. Their HTP engines were essentially steam turbines, with the steam being generated by the interaction of HTP with diesel oil and a catalyst.

Explorer suffered from so many teething troubles that her first captain never took her to sea. When these initial problems were conquered, however, she turned out to be impressively fast, achieving a peak speed of over 30 knots, a speed record at the time for a submarine, and average submerged speeds of 25 knots (46.3 km/h), aided by her streamlined hull and retractable fittings.

Both Explorer and her sister ship were fitted with the latest underwater escape technology, including a one-man escape chamber, and equipped with up to date escape breathing apparatus.

Explorer and Excalibur were popularly known as the 'blonde' submarines because of their hydrogen peroxide oxidiser and they served a useful purpose as high-speed targets for the Royal Navy's anti-submarine forces. Their main use, however, was to finally prove that HTP was impractical as an air-independent propulsion system for submarine use. The HTP was carried in special bags outside the inner pressure hull, which were prone to exploding unexpectedly. Additionally, the engine room (which was not occupied while under way) would often be the scene of flames appearing on the top of the combustion chamber, and on at least one occasion the crew were forced to evacuate the pressure hull and stand on the upper casing to avoid fumes which had suddenly filled the boat. The HTP fuel proved to be so troublesome that the boats quickly became known as Exploder and Excruciator.

Although part of the 3rd Submarine Squadron, the two submarines tended to operate independently, accompanied by their own depot ship HMS Kingfisher and a fuel carrier, the converted water-carrier, Royal Fleet Auxiliary RFA Spabeck.

There were so many practical problems with the technology, one Royal Navy submariner remarked that, 'I think the best thing we can do with peroxide is to try to get it adopted by potential enemies'.

When the US Navy succeeded in designing a nuclear reactor suitable for submarine installation, the HTP project was abandoned, and Explorer and Excalibur were scrapped.

== Bibliography ==
- Preston, Antony (1995). "United Kingdom". In Chumbley, Stephen (ed.). Conway's All The World's Fighting Ships 1947–1995. Annapolis, Maryland: Naval Institute Press. pp. 95–131. ISBN 1-55750-132-7.
- Thomas, Steve (November 2022). "Fire and Water: Britain's Fast Submarine Program". Marine News Supplement: Warships. 76 (11): S599–S613. ISSN 0966-6958.
