= HMS Sirdar (P226) =

Submarine of the Royal Navy

Coordinates: 3°55′N 96°20′E

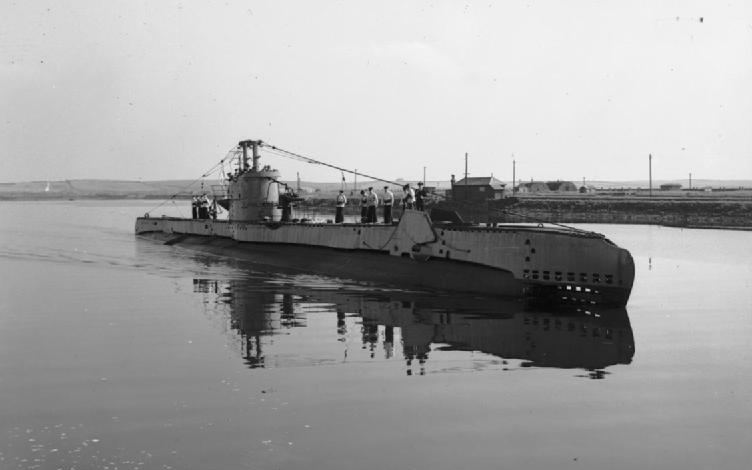
- HMS Sirdar

History

United Kingdom
- Name: Sirdar
- Builder: Scotts, Greenock
- Laid down: 24 April 1941
- Launched: 26 March 1943
- Commissioned: 20 September 1943
- Fate: broken up, 1965
- Badge

General characteristics
- Class & type: S-class submarine
- Displacement: 865 long tons (879 t) (surfaced); 990 long tons (1,010 t) (submerged)
- Length: 217 ft (66.1 m)
- Beam: 23 ft 9 in (7.2 m)
- Draught: 14 ft 8 in (4.5 m)
- Installed power: 1,900 bhp (1,400 kW) (diesel); 1,300 hp (970 kW) (electric)
- Propulsion: 2 × diesel engines; 2 × electric motors
- Speed: 15 kn (28 km/h; 17 mph) (surfaced); 10 kn (19 km/h; 12 mph) (submerged)
- Range: 6,000 nmi (11,000 km; 6,900 mi) at 10 knots (19 km/h; 12 mph) (surfaced); 120 nmi (220 km; 140 mi) at 3 knots (5.6 km/h; 3.5 mph) (submerged)
- Test depth: 300 ft (91.4 m)
- Complement: 48
- Sensors & processing systems: Type 129AR or 138 ASDIC; Type 291 early-warning radar
- Armament: 7 × 21 in (533 mm) torpedo tubes (6 × bow, 1 × stern); 1 × 3 in (76 mm) deck gun; 1 × 20 mm (0.8 in) AA gun

HMS Sirdar was an S-class submarine built for the Royal Navy during the Second World War, and part of the Third Group built of that class. She was built by Scotts, of Greenock and launched on 26 March 1943.

== Design and description ==
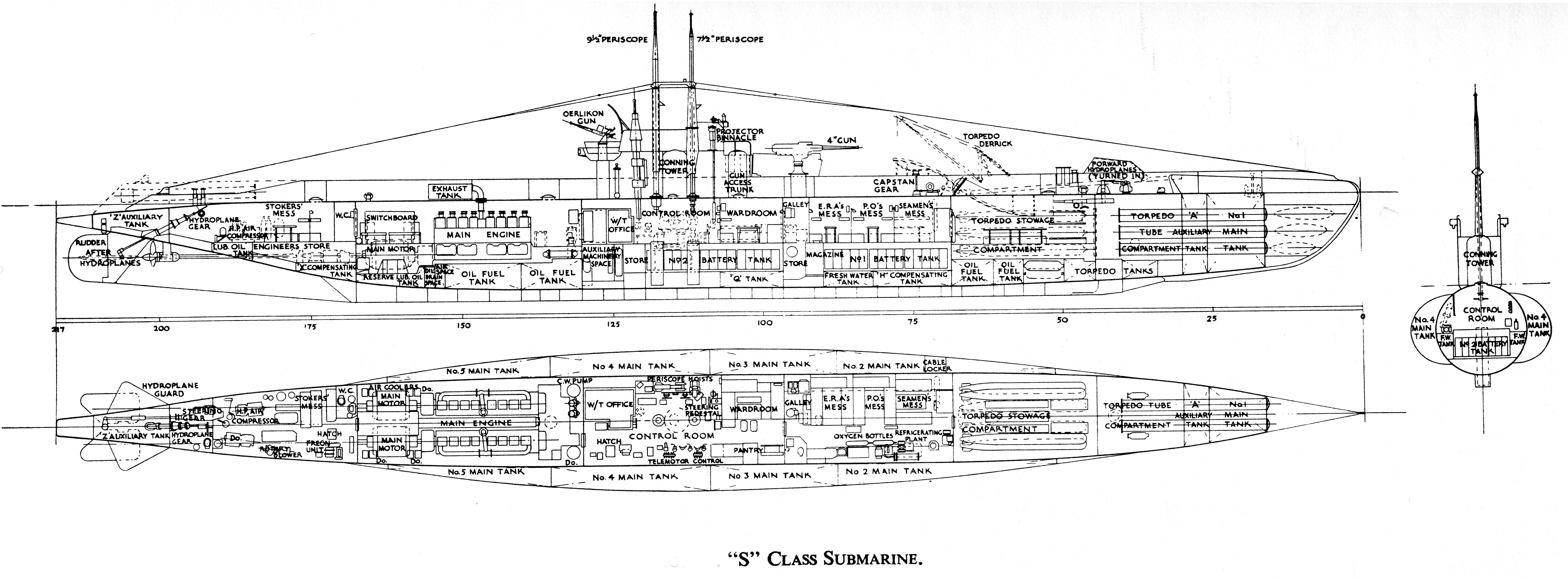
Schematic drawing of a S-class submarine

The S-class submarines were designed to patrol the restricted waters of the North Sea and the Mediterranean Sea. The third batch was slightly enlarged and improved over the preceding second batch of the S-class. The submarines had a length of 217 feet (66.1 m) overall, a beam of 23 feet 9 inches (7.2 m) and a draught of 14 feet 8 inches (4.5 m). They displaced 865 long tons (879 t) on the surface and 990 long tons (1,010 t) submerged. The S-class submarines had a crew of 48 officers and ratings. They had a diving depth of 300 feet (91.4 m).

For surface running, the boats were powered by two 950-brake-horsepower (708 kW) diesel engines, each driving one propeller shaft. When submerged each propeller was driven by a 650-horsepower (485 kW) electric motor. They could reach 15 knots (28 km/h; 17 mph) on the surface and 10 knots (19 km/h; 12 mph) underwater. On the surface, the third-batch boats had a range of 6,000 nautical miles (11,000 km; 6,900 mi) at 10 knots (19 km/h; 12 mph) and 120 nmi (220 km; 140 mi) at 3 knots (5.6 km/h; 3.5 mph) submerged.

The boats were armed with seven 21-inch (533 mm) torpedo tubes. A half-dozen of these were in the bow and there was one external tube in the stern. They carried six reload torpedoes for the bow tubes for a total of thirteen torpedoes. Twelve mines could be carried in lieu of the internally stowed torpedoes. They were also armed with a 3-inch (76 mm) deck gun. It is uncertain if Sirdar was completed with a 20-millimetre (0.8 in) Oerlikon light AA gun or had one added later. The third-batch S-class boats were fitted with either a Type 129AR or 138 ASDIC system and a Type 291 or 291W early-warning radar.

== Wartime career ==
In 1943 Sirdar made an involuntary dive to a depth of over 380 feet when she became out of control on an exercise with Tony Spender in command. She hit the muddy bottom and became stuck for a while until finally surfacing attempts were successful. Sirdar spent most of the war in the Pacific Far East, where she sank two Japanese coasters, two sailing vessels, two unidentified vessels, and the Japanese guard boat Kaiyo Maru No.5. She also damaged another coaster with gunfire.

== Postwar career ==
She survived the Second World War, and continued in service. Along with her sisters, HMS Scorcher and Scythian, Sirdar took part in the search for the missing HMS Affray in 1951. They all flew large white flags to distinguish them from the missing Affray. Sirdar later sat on the bottom for six hours while the ASDIC boats familiarised themselves with the identification of a submarine sitting on the bottom.

On the night of 31 January/1 February 1953, Sirdar was in dry dock at the naval dockyard at Sheerness, Kent when Sheerness was struck by the North Sea flood of 1953. Flood waters caused lock gates to fail, flooding the dry dock holding Sirdar and causing her to capsize. She was refloated and returned to service.

Sirdar was eventually sold, and arrived at the yards of McLellen on 31 May 1965 for breaking up.
