= ILR-33 AMBER =

Polish suborbital rocket

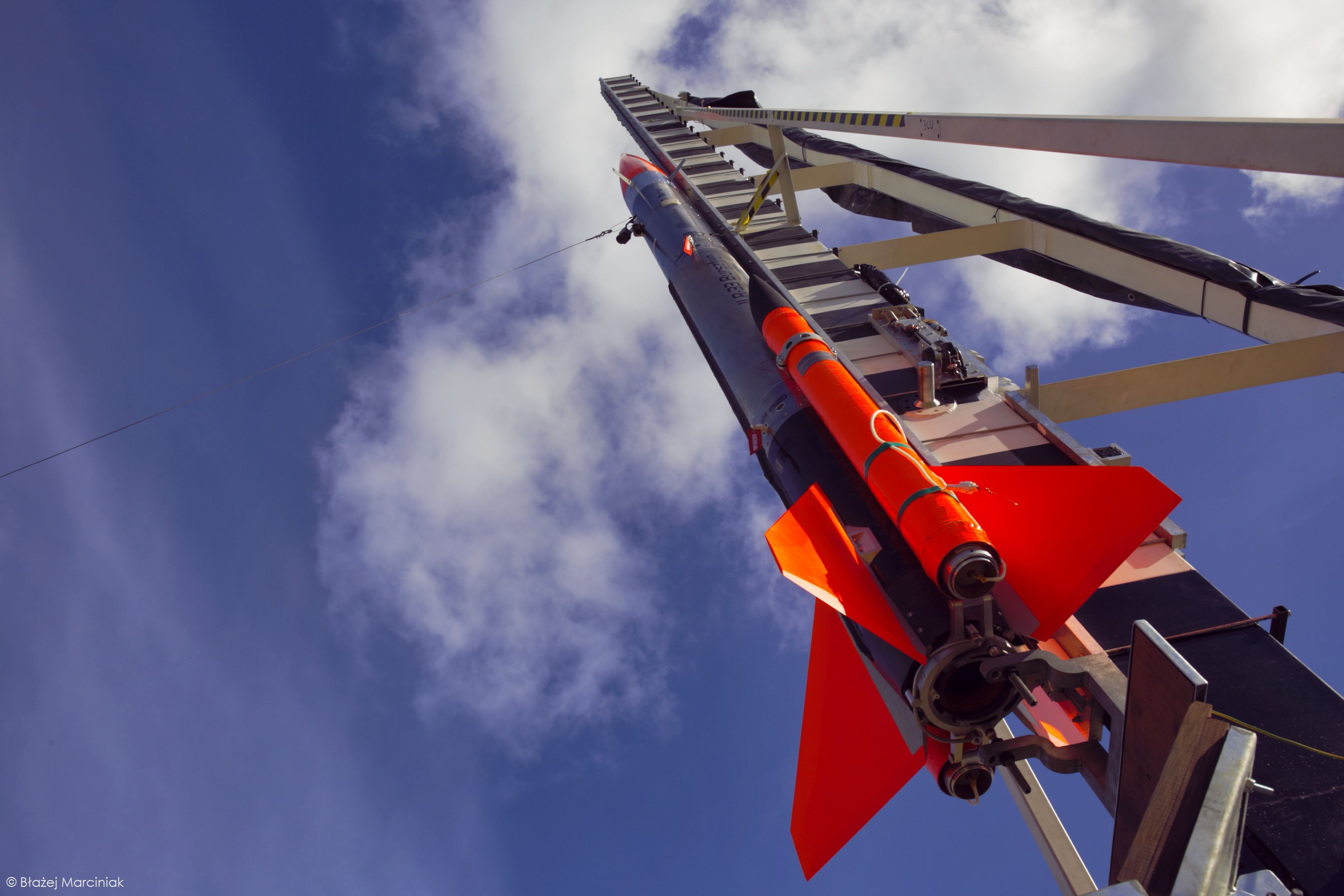
- ILR-33 ready to launch
- Function: Atmosphere sounding, conducting experiments in microgravity
- Manufacturer: Institute of Aviation, Warsaw
- Country of origin: Poland

Size
- Height: 5 m (16 ft)
- Diameter: 230 mm (9.1 in)
- Mass: 160 kg (350 lb); 270 kg (600 lb) (AMBER 2K)

Capacity

Payload to Kármán line
- Mass: 5 kg (11 lb); 10 kg (22 lb) (AMBER 2K)

Launch history
- Total launches: 5
- First flight: 2017

Boosters
- No. boosters: 2
- Powered by: Solid
- Burn time: 2.6 s 6.1 s (AMBER 2K)
- Propellant: Solid

stage
- Powered by: 1 hybrid rocket motor
- Burn time: 40 s 39 s (AMBER 2K)
- Propellant: Polyethylene / hydrogen peroxide

ILR-33 AMBER (and BURSZTYN Polish pronunciation: [ˈbur.ʂtɨn]) is a Polish multistage suborbital rocket designed by Warsaw Institute of Aviation – Łukasiewicz Research Network. The main goal of development of AMBER is gaining experience in building rocket engines and rockets themselves. AMBER can be used as a sounding rockets, performing various experiments in microgravity and as a rocket and space technologies testing platform.

== Description ==
The rocket is 5 meters tall and has a diameter of 230 mm. It consists of two solid boosters and hybrid main engine. The main engine is a Polish construction which uses highly concentrated hydrogen peroxide as oxidiser. High test peroxide is produced in-house by the Institute of Aviation and has a concentration of 98%, offering increased specific impulse and density in comparison with the more commonly used 85-87.5% peroxide. AMBER has a reusable head. The recovery of payload is done by pyrotechnical separation from head and deploying drogue and main parachutes. The payload touches down on the ground at a speed of about 8 m/s.

ILR-33 AMBER is designed to reach the Kármán line with 10 kilograms of payload. AMBER is a flagship project of Warsaw Institute of Aviation – Łukasiewicz Research Network.

== History ==
The rocket has been in development since 2014. The oxidising agent of the main engine is highly concentrated H_{2}O_{2}, as researchers from Institute have patented a unique method of obtaining this compound by distillation. The project was repeatedly awarded: the jury of International Invention and Innovation Show INTARG 2018 gave the platinum medal in category "Industry" and Ministry of Investment and Economic Development diploma. On Moscow International Salon of Inventions and Innovation Technologies 2019 Łukasiewicz Research Network – Institute of Aviation has received a silver medal for solution: "ILR-33 AMBER rocket as system of inventions and innovative platform to conduct experiments in micro-g environment".

Because of the need to adjust regulations to perform flights of AMBER and similar rockets, the boundaries of air space of CPSP Ustka were extended.

Since 2019 a new version with higher performance is under development. New version is designated as the ILR-33 BURSZTYN 2K – which is a reference to the Meteor 2K rocket. AMBER 2K will be equipped with enlarged boosters. Mass optimization of subsystems is also taking place. The service module is being prepared to host payloads – atmospheric sounding equipment or experiments using a micro-g environment

== Missions ==
The first test flight took place in 2017 on Drawsko Military Training Ground^{,} during which there were basic assumptions, mechanisms and infrastructure of rocket verified in-flight. The maximum altitude of flight was limited due to restrictions of area where AMBER was tested. Another flight, planned on the end of 2018 was cancelled due to intense jet streams.

The second successful test was in may 2019 in Drawsko Pomorskie. There was modified rocket and new systems tested, i.a. steering module. On 10 September 2019 there was another flight performed to test steering system and the recovery of payload from the surface of the Baltic Sea

List of ILR-33 AMBER missions:
Flight no.	Date	Site of launch	Apogee	Description	Video of flight	Source
1.	22 October 2017	Drawsko Military Training Ground	15 km	Test flight, verification of proper work of systems	https://www.youtube.com/watch?v=Dlw61mwYI7E	
2.	September 2018	Air Force Training Centre Ustka	–	Start cancelled due to intense jetstreams		
3.	26 May 2019	Drawsko Military Training Ground	10.5 km	Test flight with steering module	https://www.youtube.com/watch?v=Da02FBrtoM4	
4.	10 September 2019	Air Force Training Centre Ustka	23 km	Test flight, checking performance of steering module, recovery of the head from Baltic Sea		
5.	October 2022	Air Force Training Centre Ustka	8 km	First flight of the rocket in the 2K version	https://www.youtube.com/watch?v=-i8Xq84bTZs	
6.	3 July 2024	Andøya Space	101 km	2K version. First Polish rocket to reach space.	ILR-33 AMBER 2K reached 101 km! World's first rocket using 98% hydrogen peroxide as oxidizer - YouTube	

== See also ==
- Meteor – series of Polish sounding rockets, built between 1963 and 1974.
