= HMS Reclaim =

1949 Deep diving and submarine rescue ship of the Royal Navy

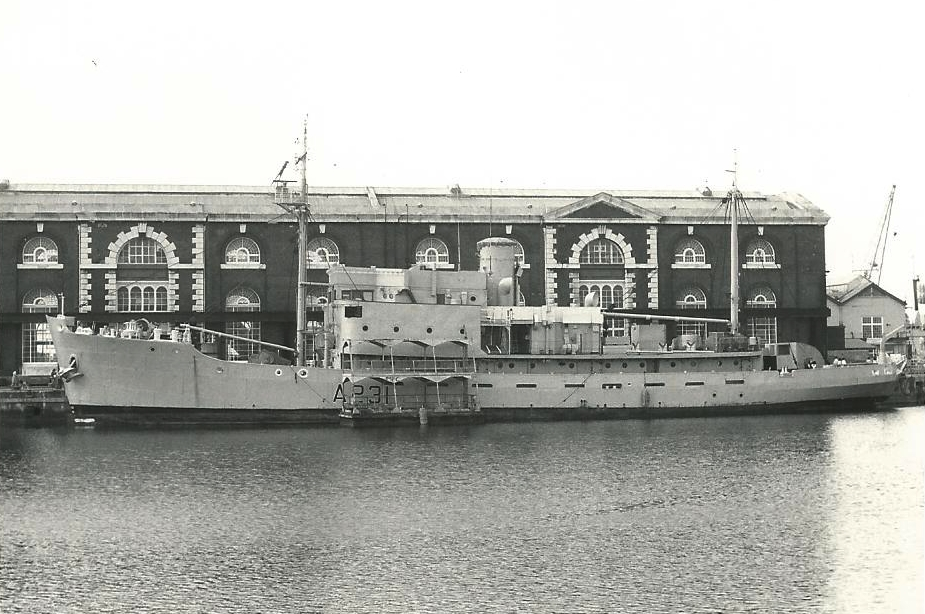

History

United Kingdom
- Name: Reclaim
- Builder: William Simons & Co Ltd, Renfrew
- Yard number: 786
- Laid down: 9 April 1946
- Launched: 12 March 1948
- Commissioned: 1949
- Decommissioned: 1979
- Fate: Broken up, 1982

General characteristics
- Displacement: 1,360 t (1,339 long tons)
- Length: 66 m (216 ft 6 in)
- Beam: 12 m (39 ft 4 in)
- Draught: 5 m (16 ft 5 in)
- Speed: 12 knots (22 km/h; 14 mph)
- Complement: 92 (including 12 divers)
- Armament: 4 x 20 mm AA guns (4 x 1)

HMS Reclaim was a deep diving and submarine rescue vessel of the British Royal Navy. She was originally intended to be the King Salvor-class ocean salvage vessel Salverdant and was fitted with specialised equipment including underwater television cameras and sonar and echosounding apparatus. She was also equipped for submarine rescue work.

At the time of her commissioning in 1949, Reclaim was the Royal Navy's only vessel capable of carrying out deep diving operations. Upon completion Reclaim was attached to HMS Vernon, Portsmouth as a diving tender.

== Operational service ==
- 1948: diving from Reclaim, Petty Officer Wilfred Bollard set a world deep diving record of 535 ft (163 m).
- 1951: on 14 June 1951 Reclaim found the submerged wreck of the submarine HMS Affray, missing since 17 April, during which operation her new underwater television apparatus was used. One of the divers from Reclaim working on the Affray was Lionel "Buster" Crabb, who later became famous when in 1956 he disappeared in Portsmouth harbour.
- 1953: Attended the Coronation Fleet Review at Spithead.
- 1956: Lt. George Wookey of the Royal Navy's Clearance Diving Branch dived from HMS Reclaim to set a new deep diving record of 600 ft (180 m) in Sor Fjord, Norway on 12 October 1956.
- 1960: Reclaim was assigned to HMS Lochinvar, Port Edgar for service as a Mine Counter Measures Support Ship and Diving Trials Ship. From January and May 1961 she carried out diving trials in the Canary Isles. She was later relieved as Mine Counter Measures Support Ship by the minelayer HMS Abdiel, which enabled her to concentrate on her roles as deep diving support vessel.
- 1962: Deep Diving Trials programme begun, culminating in ten dives off Toulon in 1965 to 600 ft (180 m).
- 1968: Reclaim took part in the salvage operation on the Aer Lingus Viscount 803 Aircraft EI-AOM, the "Saint Phelim", which had crashed into the Irish Sea off Tuskar Rock on 24 March 1968. Over a period of 26 days, divers working from the Reclaim performed 91 dives in depths of 250 ft (76 m), managing to salvage a third of the aircraft's wreckage. Unfortunately, when Reclaim attempted to raise the fuselage to the surface using straps instead of nets, the wreckage broke apart upon reaching the surface and sank.
- 1974: Reclaim despatched to Harstad in Norway in May to recover a ditched Wessex helicopter from HMS Hermes. The Wessex was only located when Reclaim, using its underwater camera capability snagged the helicopter with the camera. A largely successful operation was spoiled when the gearbox and engine pulled out of the body of the aircraft.
- 1977: Reclaim attended the 1977 Silver Jubilee Fleet Review off Spithead. Reclaim was the only ship to attend both the Coronation and Silver Jubilee reviews.
- 1979: Reclaim (at that time the oldest ship in the Navy), was paid off, to be replaced by the new Seabed Operations Vessel Challenger.
- 15 May 1982 arrived at Bruges, Belgium for demolition.

== Trivia ==
HMS Reclaim served as a filming location for the Doctor Who serial "The Sea Devils" in 1971.

It was the last British warship to have sails. Although rarely used, they could add half a knot to her speed.
