= Thode =

Thode may refer to:

== People ==
- Amerigo Thodé (1950–2023), Curaçaoan politician
- Connell Thode (1911–2014), New Zealand naval officer and yachtsman
- Harry Thode (1910–1997), Canadian geochemist, nuclear chemist, and academic administrator
- Henry Thode (1857–1920), German art historian

== Places ==
- Thode, Saskatchewan, village in Saskatchewan, Canada
- Thode Island, Antarctic island

== Other uses ==
- Thoda Hai Thode Ki Zaroorat Hai, Indian soap opera aired in 1997
- Thodi Khushi Thode Gham, Indian soap opera on Sony Entertainment Television India
