= Connell Thode =

New Zealand naval officer and yachtsman

Lieutenant Commander Connell Percy Thode OBE
- Born: 11 March 1911; Auckland, New Zealand
- Died: 9 October 2014 (aged 103)
- Military career
- Allegiance: United Kingdom
- Branch: Royal Navy
- Rank: Lieutenant Commander
- Commands: HMS Scythian
- Conflicts: World War II
- Awards: Mention in Despatches (2); Officer of the Order of the British Empire

Connell Percy Thode OBE (11 March 1911 – 9 October 2014) was a New Zealand naval officer and yachtsman. He served in the Royal Naval Volunteer Reserve during World War II and commanded HMS Scythian, an S class submarine of the Royal Navy.

== Early life ==
Born in Auckland in 1911, Thode was educated at Mount Albert Grammar School from 1925 to 1926. An accomplished yachtsman, he joined the Royal New Zealand Yacht Squadron in 1933, and skippered the keel sloop Iorangi. His skill was such that he was in contention to be a crew member on Thomas Sopwith's America's Cup challenge, but this did not proceed following the outbreak of World War II.

== World War II service ==
After the war began, Thode worked his passage to the United Kingdom, where he joined the Royal Naval Volunteer Reserve and served in submarines. He was appointed navigator of HMS Proteus, a Parthian-class submarine based in Egypt, in mid-1941. In June 1942 he was mentioned in despatches for gallant and distinguished service in successful patrols while serving on that vessel. He then was made first lieutenant aboard HMS Ultor, a U-class submarine, before gaining command of HMS Scythian in late 1944. He received his second mention in despatches in November 1945. Thode was one of only three New Zealanders to command a submarine during World War II, and the only one serving in the naval reserve to do so.

== Later life ==
Thode spent 25 years teaching young New Zealanders to sail on the training ships Spirit of Adventure and Spirit of New Zealand. In the 1996 New Year Honours, he was appointed an Officer of the Order of the British Empire, for services to yachting.

Thode is believed to have been the oldest person to complete the 2013 New Zealand census online, when aged 101 years. He died on 9 October 2014 and his funeral service was held in St Christopher's Chapel at the Devonport Naval Base in Auckland. His ashes were buried at North Shore Memorial Park in Albany.
