= HMS Affray =

Submarine of the Royal Navy

Coordinates: 49°50′N 2°34′W

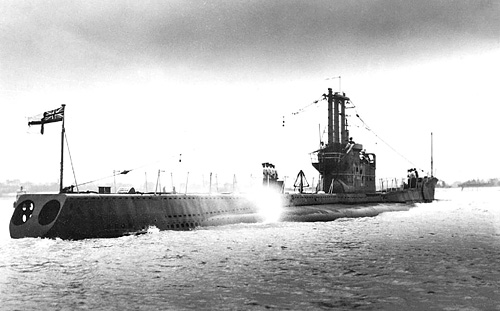
- Affray, last Royal Navy submarine to be lost at sea.

History

United Kingdom
- Ordered: Late May 1943
- Builder: Cammell Laird, Birkenhead
- Laid down: 16 January 1944
- Launched: 12 April 1944
- Commissioned: 25 November 1945
- Stricken: June 1951
- Identification: Pennant number: P421
- Fate: Foundered 16 April 1951

General characteristics
- Displacement: 1,385 tons surfaced; 1,620 tons submerged
- Length: 281 ft 9 in (85.88 m)
- Beam: 22 ft 6 in (6.86 m)
- Draught: 17 ft (5.2 m)
- Propulsion: diesel-electric, 4,300 hp (3,200 kW) surfaced, 1,250 hp (930 kW) submerged
- Speed: 18.5 knots (34.3 km/h) surfaced; 8 knots (15 km/h) submerged
- Range: 10,500 nmi (19,400 km) at 11 kn (20 km/h) surfaced
- Complement: 6 officers and 55 men
- Armament: one 4-inch (100 mm) gun; one Oerlikon 20 mm cannon; three .303-calibre machine guns; ten 21 inch (533 mm) torpedo tubes (four bow, two bow external, two stern, two stern external), 20 torpedoes

HMS Affray was a British Amphion-class submarine. Affray was built in the closing stages of the Second World War. She was one of 16 submarines of her class which were originally designed for use in the Pacific Ocean against Japan.

She was the last Royal Navy submarine to be lost at sea, on 16 April 1951, with the loss of 75 lives.

== History ==
=== Early history ===
HMS Affray was laid down at the Cammell Laird yard in Birkenhead on 16 January 1944, launched on 12 April and commissioned on 25 November 1945. Affray and her sisters were state-of-the-art submarines at the time of their launching. They were the culmination of a rapid submarine development driven by the Second World War. Some elements of her design were taken from captured Nazi German U-boats. Her modular style of manufacture and all-welded hull were unique at the time. For work in the Far East she was equipped with refrigeration and two huge air conditioners, and all her accommodation was placed as far away from the engine room as possible. She also had ten torpedo tubes which made her and her class some of the most formidable submarines in the world at that time.

She was sent to the submarine tender HMS Montclare at Rothesay, as part of the 3rd Submarine Flotilla, before joining her sisters HMS Amphion, Astute, Auriga, Aurochs and the submarine tender HMS Adamant in the British Pacific Fleet. The following four years Affray was on travel and took part in exercises all over the globe, visiting such places as Australia, Singapore, Japan, Morocco, South Africa, Pearl Harbor and Bergen.

=== Modification ===
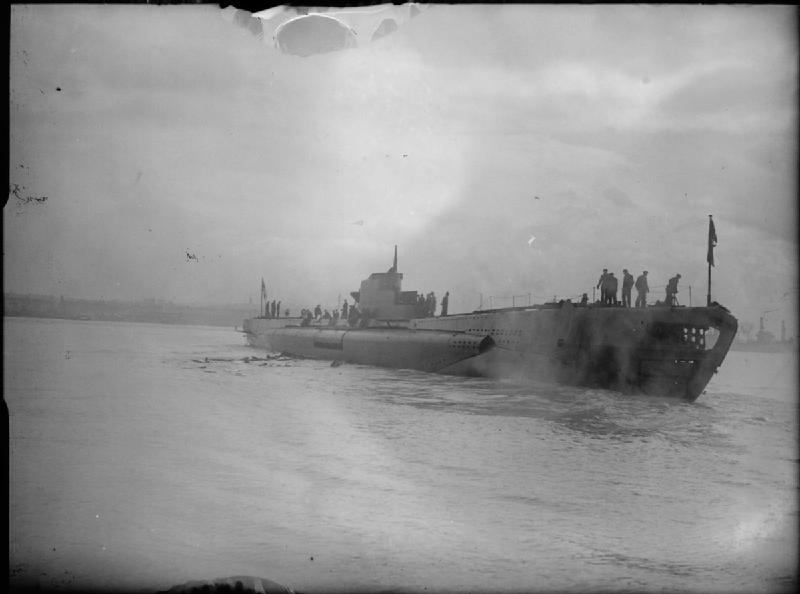
Affray after launching at the Cammel Laird ship yard, Birkenhead, 1944

On 11 March 1949 she was transferred to the 5th Submarine Flotilla reserve and entered drydock to be retrofitted with a snort mast (snorkel device)—a pneumatically raised and lowered steel tube which, when in the vertical position, worked as an air induction/exhaust emission device. Once vertical it was self-locking and drew air into the submarine at periscope depth, permitting the submarine to charge batteries and run diesels for propulsion below the surface, allowing the sub to remain underwater. At the point where the air intake entered the pressure hull of the submarine, there was a bulbous casting—set about half a metre above the hull, this housed the main induction valve. This very important casting was totally concealed and protected by the free-flooding hull. The snort mast on the Affray was designed for both air intake and exhaust venting; this was later changed to be an air intake only and the exhaust was moved to the rear of the conning tower. The snort mast had a float valve that would close automatically if the submarine dropped below periscope depth. In December of that same year Affray was sent to the Mediterranean; it was recorded during deep dives in this sea that she began "leaking like a sieve" and that the Admiralty-class diesels started leaking oil.

In January 1951 Affray was transferred to Portsmouth Naval base to join Reserve group "G". In March she was brought out of reserve, and Lieutenant John Blackburn DSC was appointed CO and given the task of bringing her and the new crew up to operational status.

=== Loss ===
On 16 April 1951, Affray set out on a simulated war mission called Exercise Spring Train. The submarine had a reduced crew of 50 from 61. They were joined by one sergeant, one corporal, and two marines from the Special Boat Service; a commander (Engineer), a naval instructor, seven lieutenants in the engineering branch, and 13 sub-lieutenants. The last two groups were undergoing an essential submarine officer training course. This made her complement 75 in total. Her captain's orders were unusually flexible: the Marines were to be dropped off somewhere along the south west coast of England—the captain told the Admiralty he had chosen an isolated beach in Cornwall—come ashore and return under the cover of darkness. The exercise was expected to continue until Affray was due to return to base on 23 April for essential defect repairs including a leak in a battery tank. Affray left her home base at about 1600 hrs, and made normal contact to confirm position, course, speed etc at 2100 hrs, and indicated she was preparing to dive. The last ship to see her on the surface was the 'Co' Class destroyer HMS Contest returning to Portsmouth that evening. As they passed each other, both vessels piped the side. When she missed her 0800 report due the next day she was declared missing and an immediate search began.

=== Search ===
Shore stations called Affray all day. HMS Agincourt led a fleet of search vessels which eventually totalled 24 ships from four nations. The Portland 2nd Training Flotilla which included HMS Tintagel Castle, Flint Castle, Hedingham Castle, and ASDIC (sonar) trials vessel Helmsdale, left Portland. The surface-vessels were joined by the submarines HMS Scorcher, Scythian, and Sirdar, also from Portland. All flew large white flags to distinguish them from the missing Affray. Sirdar later sat on the bottom for six hours while the ASDIC boats familiarised themselves with the identification of a submarine in this position. The codeword 'SUBMISS' was sent to all ships in the NATO navies to notify them of the fact the Affray was missing and all other Amphion-class boats were confined to port pending investigation as to what happened to their missing sister.

There was some urgency in the initial 48 hours of the search as it was estimated the crew would not survive much longer than this if they had survived whatever had sunk the submarine. During the search a Morse code signal (via tapping on the submarine hull) had been received by two of the searching ships, reading "We are trapped on the bottom", but this did not help in locating the sub. Differing accounts however state that a tapping, initially believed to be from the trapped crew, was heard, but after later investigation was ruled by the admiralty to be from other ships involved in the search. After three days the search was slowed down and fewer ships were involved.

The disappearance of Affray became a prominent news item in Britain, and relegated the first events that culminated in the Suez Crisis to page two of the national newspapers. Rumours abounded of mutiny, and even seizure by the Russians. Meanwhile the Royal Navy continued its search. During the search many strange things happened, including that the wife of a skipper of one of Affray's sister submarines claimed to have seen a ghost in a dripping wet submarine officer's uniform telling her the location of the sunken sub— she recognised him as an officer who had died during the Second World War, not a crew member of Affray. As there were so many shipwrecks littering the English Channel (161 were found, most of them sunk during the Second World War), it was almost two months before Affray was located.

=== Discovery ===
Wreck of the Affray, as seen on the television screen on board the salvage vessel

Wreck location, in the English Channel

On 14 June HMS Loch Fyne made the initial asdic contact on the very edge of Hurds Deep, a deep underwater valley in the English Channel, and made the first notification to the Admiralty. It was the same location where an oil slick had been sighted at the same time Affray vanished and was in an area that had been searched before. HMS Reclaim arrived several hours later after an excited call from the Captain of Loch Insh who, as an ex-submariner, was convinced this was Affray. HMS Reclaim subsequently investigated using Rosse Stamp's new waterproof camera. A dive was made down to the contact and the diver reported seeing a long white handrail before being dragged along with the flow of the current. Due to the weather being worse than usual the crew decided to use the underwater camera that they had previously been sceptical of. As soon as it was sent down the very first thing the camera picked up were the letters "YARFFA"—Affray backwards.

The submarine was 17 miles (27 km) northwest of Alderney, a lot closer to France than England. She lay slightly to port, facing northeast in 86 metres (282 ft) of water. During the next few months she slid a little more to port where she appears to have rested on a roughly 50 degree angle. Divers could find no evidence of collision or damage to the hull, casing or bridge and it was noted that the search periscope and ANF radar mast were extended, indicating she had been at periscope depth when she foundered. However, the snort mast had been broken and lay next to the sub, attached by only a thin shred of metal. The hatches and torpedo doors were all shut, and the two emergency buoys were still located within the casing, although the after one could not have been released as the hinged wooden gratings retaining it had been wired shut (it was later discovered that it had been wired shut because it often broke free whilst the sub was underway). It was obvious that no attempt to escape had been made. The only external clue that the crew had done anything to rectify their dilemma was the bow hydroplanes being set to hard arise; the bridge telegraphs also were in the stop position. The snort mast was the only part of the submarine that was recovered, and it was later found to be of faulty manufacture. This may have contributed to the sinking of Affray (see below).

== Investigation ==
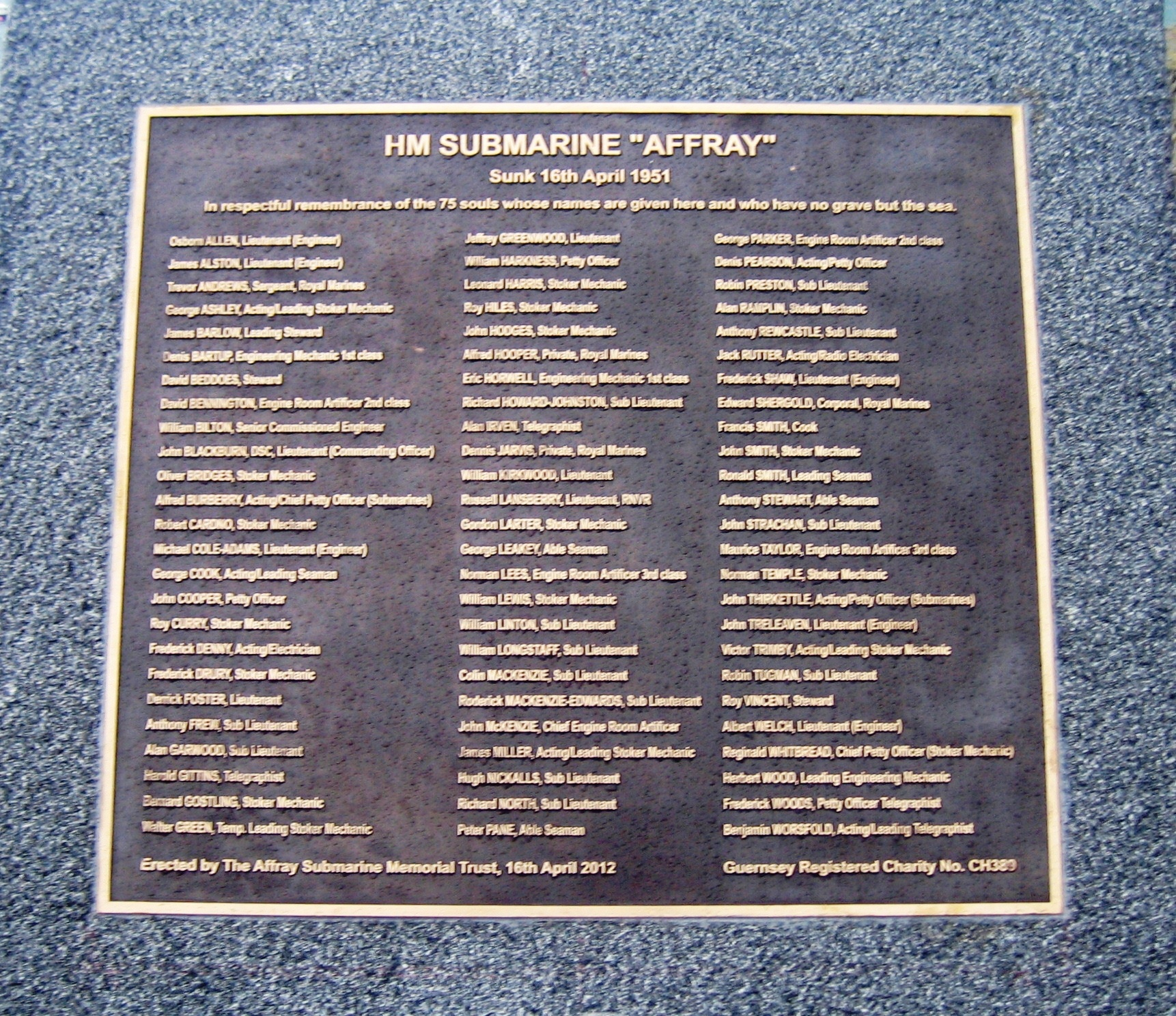
Plaque in Gosport for the submarine Affray, 2012

Several reasons have been put forward for the cause of the submarine's sinking. The snort mast was broken and lay next to the hull so it was initially thought that this had broken and flooded the submarine. After a detailed inspection of the snort mast itself, which showed no sign of being struck, it was thought more likely that it had been broken when the submarine hit the bottom (the snort mast was later tested and although it was found to be of faulty manufacture, tests indicated it should still have stood up to normal use). The official board of inquiry held the broken snort to be the primary cause of the sinking.

However, Sir Victor Shepheard, the Director of Naval Construction, disputed the finding. Shepheard and others suggested that a battery explosion was also a possibility, owing to the angle at which the ship was resting on the seabed.

The Royal Navy tried to scan the interior when Affray was first discovered, using a primitive radioactive device. This yielded minimal information about the internal condition of the submarine, but it did seem to show that the internal valve for the snort mast was in the open position, which would indicate that at least one compartment flooded and some of the crew had drowned when she first hit the bottom (see USS Squalus for a similar situation). During this attempt one of the (pea-sized) X-ray pods was accidentally lost near the sub and the Admiralty decided against further attempts to establish why Affray sank, mostly due to the various dangers to any divers (one Royal Navy diver lost his life attempting to identify another sunken submarine during the search).

A more recent theory put forward by a few experts is that the snort mast dropped below the surface and the float valve (described above) jammed or somehow failed to stop the water entering the sub. With water entering at up to 13 tons per minute, this could have caused the submarine to drop rapidly to the bottom. With a reduced crew and the trainees in the way hampering activities, there would have been a delay in stopping the inflow of water. By the time the valve was shut or the flooding compartment that contained the valve sealed off, there would have been so much water aboard that even blowing all her ballast would not have been sufficient to get her to the surface. Or if the flooded compartment/s included the control room, there would have been no one alive to blow ballast. It is also possible, with trainees on board possibly operating systems, that a problem with the clutch caused the Affray to accelerate into the sea bottom disabling some parts of the submarine that would have helped her rise to the surface.

=== Parliamentary debate, Affray Fund and memorial ===
On 24 January 2012 the circumstances of the sinking and its effects on families of survivors were debated in parliament with questions from Tim Farron to Nick Harvey. The debate highlighted the existence of the Affray Submarine Memorial Fund and the experiences of Mrs June Tower, widow of crew member John Treleaven. The trustees of the fund are the Lord Mayor of Portsmouth, the mayor of Gosport and the Public Trustee. The fund assisted with the erection of a memorial plaque in Saint Anne, Alderney that was unveiled 16 April 2012.

== Wreck ==
Almost half a century after the loss, Innes McCartney, an experienced trimix diver, obtained the position of Affray from the Ministry of Defence and dived to the sunken submarine. He reported:

As we descended down the shotline, a large dark shape emerged from the gloom. Little ambient light penetrates to 83 metres even on a good day on the edge of Hurd Deep and it was a while before we recognised the unmistakable shape of a submarine. She is a hugely impressive sight, sitting almost totally clear of a hard seabed, offering in excess of 10 metres of relief in places. Our lighting showed that she is now covered with sponges and anemones, offering some welcome colour in the darkness. The first thing that struck me about the wreck was her sheer size. She is one of the largest submarine wrecks in the Channel and a diver is hard pushed to swim all the way around her on a single dive. She lies slightly over on her port side, with her bows pointing Northeast. She is not very heavily netted with only a few craypots caught up around the hull. The wreck is in a very good state of preservation considering the 47 years she has been on the seabed. Her bridge is completely intact with speaking tubes, the projector binnacle and radio aerials all in evidence. On the side of the conning tower her navigation lights are present and the conning tower ladder is still in place. Her periscope shafts stand proudly upright and even the cables that ran between them are still there. Forward of the tower the foredeck is intact with the gun layers hatch clearly visible. I was keen to find the cradle in which the snort mast was located when in use. This was on the port side, aft of the tower and on our second dive on the wreck I found it. The base of the snort mast was still in place, with the area where the mast broke off clearly visible. On a later visit to the Royal Navy Submarine Museum, I saw the base of the section of the mast that was raised. They would still fit together perfectly. The fore and aft hydroplanes are still in position and the external torpedo tubes on the bow are a very impressive sight. Aft of the conning tower, there is evidence of the salvage attempts made by the Royal Navy in 1951. The diving team discovered no other damage to the wreck apart from the missing snort mast. This is in accordance with the findings of the Royal Navy's investigation. She remains a significant and salutary reminder of our naval heritage. Very few divers in the UK have the experience and capability to undertake such a dive. This should ensure that the Affray remains undisturbed for posterity. She is a war grave and the final resting place of 75 naval personnel and this should be respected.

The crew remain entombed in the submarine on the northern edge of Hurd's Deep. As of 2001, under the Protection of Military Remains Act 1986, Affray was made a controlled site, making it illegal to dive her without a permit from the Ministry of Defence.

== See also ==
- List of disasters in Great Britain and Ireland by death toll

== Publications ==
Gallop, Alan: 'Subsmash - the Mysterious Disappearance of HMS Affray' published by The History Press, 2007

- Affray Portrait of a disaster
