= HMS Scorcher =

Submarine of the Royal Navy

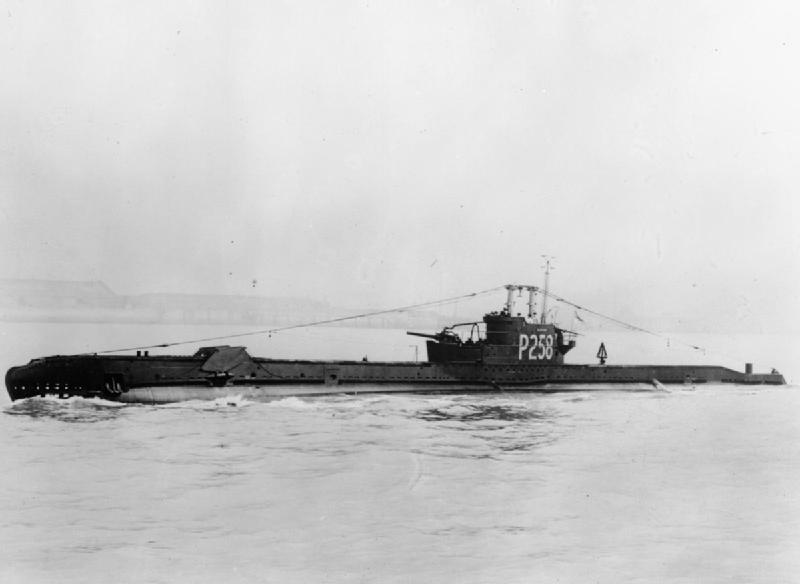
- Scorcher

History

United Kingdom
- Name: Scorcher
- Ordered: 7 April 1943
- Builder: Cammell Laird, Birkenhead
- Laid down: 14 December 1943
- Launched: 18 December 1944
- Commissioned: 16 March 1945
- Fate: Broken up, 1962
- Badge

General characteristics
- Class & type: S-class submarine
- Displacement: 814-872 tons surfaced; 990 tons submerged
- Length: 217 ft (66 m)
- Beam: 23 ft 6 in (7.16 m)
- Draught: 11 ft (3.4 m)
- Speed: 14.75 knots surfaced; 8 knots submerged
- Complement: 48 officers and men
- Armament: 6 × forward 21 inch (533 mm) torpedo tubes, one aft; 13 torpedoes; one three-inch (76 mm) gun (QF 4-inch on later boats); one 20 mm cannon; three .303-calibre machine gun

HMS Scorcher was an S-class submarine of the Royal Navy, and part of the third group built of that class. She was built by Cammell Laird and launched on 18 December 1944. So far she has been the only ship of the Royal Navy to bear the name Scorcher. She was launched by Thomas Beacham, a Foreman Driller employed by Cammell Laird.

Built as the Second World War was drawing to a close, she did not see much action. Along with her sisters, HMS Sirdar and Scythian, Scorcher took part in the search for the missing HMS Affray in 1951. Scorcher too had her fair share of accidents. She was damaged in a collision on 4 February 1956, and suffered a fire during exercises on 22 November 1956. In 1953 she took part in the Fleet Review to celebrate the Coronation of Queen Elizabeth II.

Scorcher was eventually paid off and broken up at Charlestown in 1962.
