= HMS Scythian =

Submarine of the Royal Navy

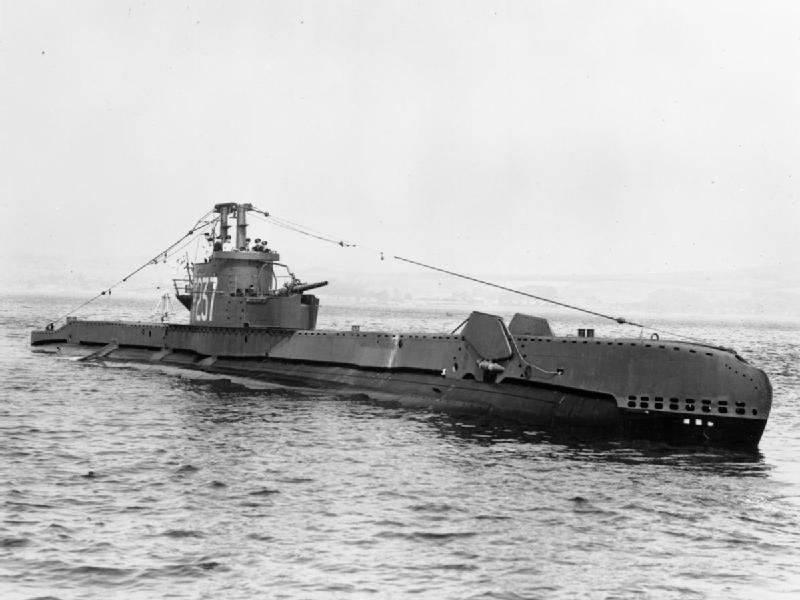
- Scythian

History

United Kingdom
- Name: Scythian
- Builder: Scotts, Greenock
- Laid down: 21 February 1943
- Launched: 14 April 1944
- Commissioned: 11 August 1944
- Fate: Broken up, August 1960
- Badge

General characteristics
- Class & type: S-class submarine
- Displacement: 865 long tons (879 t) surfaced; 990 long tons (1,010 t) submerged
- Length: 217 ft (66.1 m)
- Beam: 23 ft 9 in (7.2 m)
- Draught: 14 ft 8 in (4.5 m)
- Installed power: 1,900 bhp (1,400 kW) (diesel); 1,300 hp (970 kW) (electric)
- Propulsion: 2 × diesel engines; 2 × electric motors
- Speed: 15 kn (28 km/h; 17 mph) surfaced; 10 kn (19 km/h; 12 mph) submerged
- Range: 7,500 nmi (13,900 km; 8,600 mi) at 10 knots (19 km/h; 12 mph) surface; 120 nmi (220 km; 140 mi) at 3 knots (5.6 km/h; 3.5 mph) submerged
- Test depth: 350 feet (106.7 m)
- Complement: 48
- Armament: 6 × bow 21 in (533 mm) torpedo tubes; 1 × 4-inch (102 mm) deck gun; 1 × 20 mm (0.8 in) Oerlikon AA gun

HMS Scythian was a S-class submarine of the third batch built for the Royal Navy during World War II. She survived the war and was sold for scrap in 1960.

== Design and description ==
The third batch was slightly enlarged and improved over the preceding second batch of the S-class. The submarines had a length of 217 feet (66.1 m) overall, a beam of 23 feet 9 inches (7.2 m) and a draught of 14 feet 8 inches (4.5 m). They displaced 865 long tons (879 t) on the surface and 990 long tons (1,010 t) submerged. The S-class submarines had a crew of 48 officers and ratings. They had a diving depth of 300 feet (91.4 m).

For surface running, the boats were powered by two 950-brake-horsepower (708 kW) diesel engines, each driving one propeller shaft. When submerged each propeller was driven by a 650-horsepower (485 kW) electric motor. They could reach 15 knots (28 km/h; 17 mph) on the surface and 10 knots (19 km/h; 12 mph) underwater. On the surface, the third-batch boats had a range of 6,000 nautical miles (11,000 km; 6,900 mi) at 10 knots (19 km/h; 12 mph) and 120 nmi (220 km; 140 mi) at 3 knots (5.6 km/h; 3.5 mph) submerged.

Scythian was armed with six 21 inch (533 mm) torpedo tubes in the bow. She carried six reload torpedoes for a total of a dozen torpedoes. Twelve mines could be carried in lieu of the torpedoes. The boat was also equipped with a 4-inch (102 mm) deck gun and a 20-millimetre (0.8 in) Oerlikon AA gun.

== Construction and career ==
HMS Scythian built by Scotts, of Greenock and launched on 14 April 1944. Thus far she has been the only ship of the Royal Navy to bear the name Scythian. Built as the Second World War was drawing to a close, she did not see much action, spending the period between March and May 1945 on the eastern station. Here, she managed to sink nine Japanese sailing vessels and a small unidentified Japanese vessel.

Along with her sisters, Scorcher and Sirdar, Scythian took part in the search for the missing HMS Affray in 1951. Scythian was paid off and arrived at Charlestown on 8 August 1960 for breaking up.
