= Charles Eric Rhodes =

British Royal Navy Officer

- Born: 3 April 1928
- Died: 16 June 1955 (aged 27)
- Military career
- Allegiance: United Kingdom
- Branch: Royal Navy
- Unit: Royal Naval Volunteer Reserve
- Conflicts: Second World War

Charles Eric Rhodes AM (3 April 1928 – 16 June 1955) was a British officer in the Royal Naval Volunteer Reserve who was posthumously awarded the Albert Medal for his actions during the rescue of submariners from HMS Sidon on 16 June 1955.

== Albert Medal citation ==
From the London Gazette, 1 November 1955

Admiralty, Whitehall, S.W.1.
1 November 1955
The QUEEN has been graciously pleased to approve the posthumous award of the Albert Medal for gallantry in saving life at sea to:—
Temporary Surgeon Lieutenant Charles Eric RHODES, M.B., B.S., M.R.C.S., L.R.C.P., R.N.V.R.
An explosion occurred in H.M. Submarine SIDON in Portland Harbour on, 16th June, 1955, which later caused the submarine to sink. Surgeon Lieutenant Rhodes was among the first to enter the SIDON after the explosion and, in spite of the total darkness and dense smoke, he brought out an injured man to safety. He then put on a Davis Submarine Escape Apparatus and re-entered the submarine with morphia to give further help to the injured. In doing so he greatly prejudiced his chance of escape. He was not a submarine officer and was not familiar with the use of the breathing apparatus or the lay-out inside a submarine. In spite of these handicaps and the pitch darkness his only thoughts were for those within the submarine; he had no hesitation in re-entering the SIDON and he succeeded in helping two more men to escape before the submarine sank. Surgeon Lieutenant Rhodes' gallant and selfless act in helping to save the lives of others cost him his own life.
