= Institute of Aviation (Poland) =

Polish research institute

Institute of Aviation, Warsaw
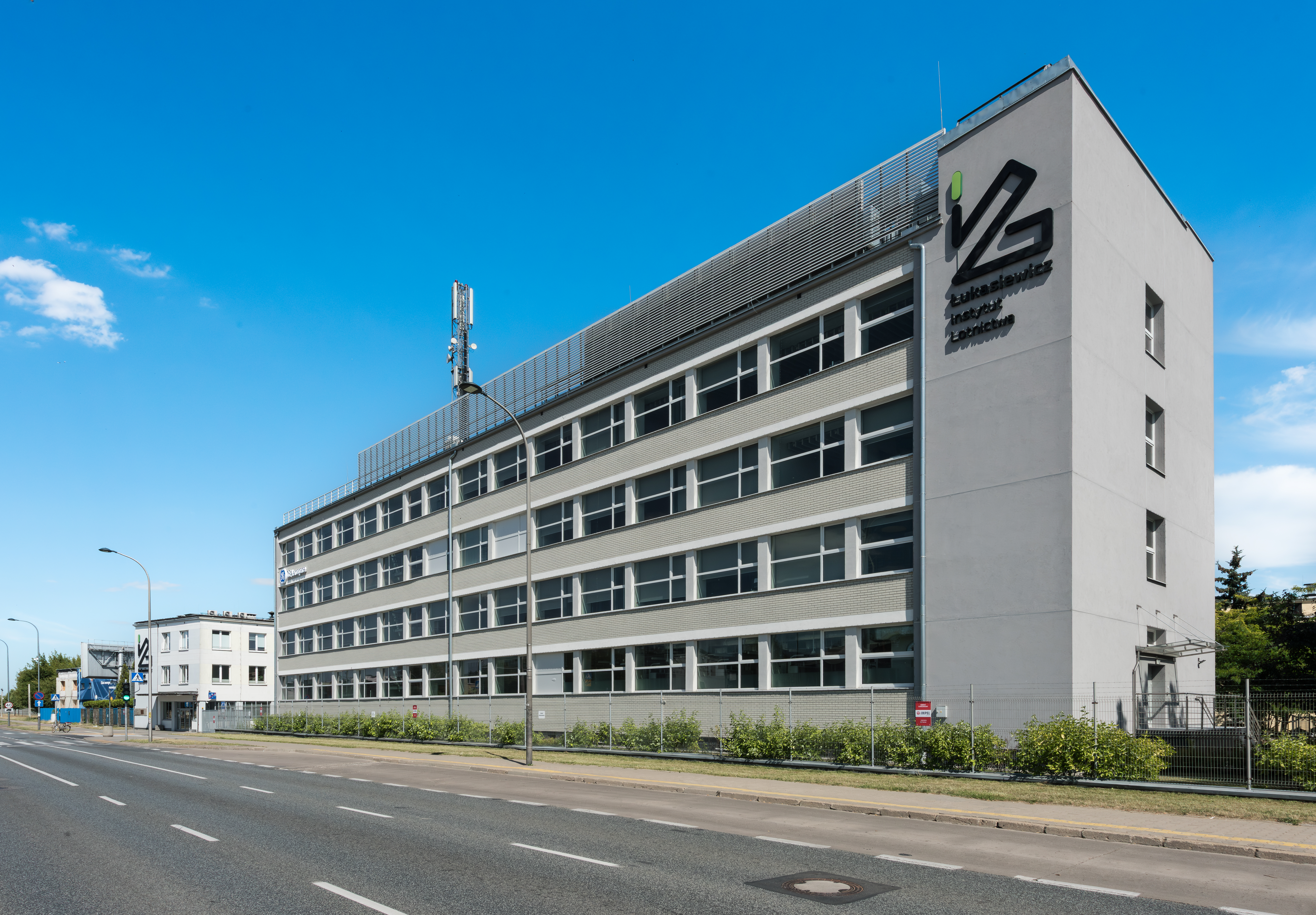
- Established: 1926
- Location: Warsaw, Poland
- Website: Official website

The Institute of Aviation, or Warsaw Institute of Aviation, or Łukasiewicz-ILOT (Polish: Instytut Lotnictwa) is a research and development center established in 1926, located in Warsaw, Poland. The Institute joined the Lukasiewicz Research Network in 2019 and the International Astronautical Federation in 2022.

== Activities ==
The activities of the facility focus on providing design, engineering, and research services in the field of aviation and aerospace. The institute conducts international cooperation with European Union and transatlantic countries in the following areas (primarily with General Electric under the Engineering Design Center): aircraft engines, aerodynamics, aircraft structures, and materials research. Łukasiewicz-ILOT also collaborates with Boeing, Airbus, and Pratt & Whitney and conducts research for other sectors of the economy.

== See also ==
- Maia – European orbital reusable rocket
- List of Polish satellites
