= HMS Sidon (P259) =

Royal Navy submarine sunk in Portland Harbour by explosion of a faulty torpedo

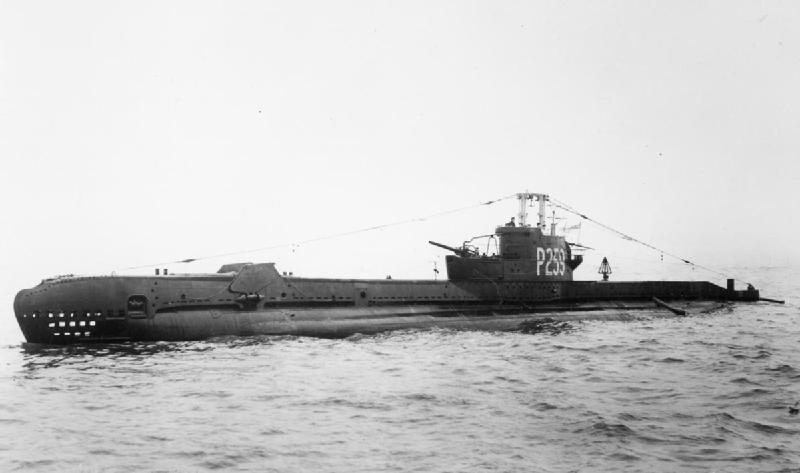
- HMS Sidon

History

United Kingdom
- Name: HMS Sidon
- Builder: Cammell Laird Shipyard - Birkenhead
- Laid down: 7 July 1943
- Launched: 4 September 1944
- Commissioned: 23 November 1944
- Fate: Wrecked by own torpedo explosion 16 June 1955; Refloated, sunk for target practice 14 June 1957
- Badge

General characteristics
- Class & type: S-class submarine
- Displacement: 814-872 tons surfaced; 990 tons submerged
- Length: 217 ft (66 m)
- Beam: 23 ft 6 in (7.16 m)
- Draught: 11 ft (3.4 m)
- Speed: 14.75 knots (27 km/h) surfaced; 8 knots (15 km/h) submerged
- Complement: 48 officers and men
- Armament: 6 × forward 21-inch (533 mm) torpedo tubes, one aft; 13 torpedoes; 1 × 3 in (76 mm) gun; 1 × 20 mm cannon; 3 × .303-calibre machine gun

HMS Sidon was a submarine of the Royal Navy, launched in September 1944, one of the third group of S class built by Cammell Laird & Co Limited, Birkenhead, named after the naval bombardment of Sidon in 1840. In 1953 she took part in the Fleet Review to celebrate the Coronation of Queen Elizabeth II. An explosion caused by a faulty torpedo sank her in Portland Harbour with the loss of 13 lives in 1955.

== Accident ==
On the morning of 16 June 1955, Sidon was moored alongside the depot ship HMS Maidstone in Portland Harbour. Two 21-inch (533 mm) Mark 12 high test peroxide-powered torpedoes, code-named "Fancy", had been loaded aboard for testing. Fifty-six officers and crewmen were aboard.

At 08:25, an explosion in one of the "Fancy" torpedoes (but not the warhead) burst the number-three torpedo tube into which it had been loaded and ruptured the two forward-most watertight bulkheads. Fire, toxic gases, and smoke accompanied the blast. Twelve men in the forward compartments died instantly and seven others were seriously injured.

The submarine started to settle by the bow with a list to starboard, and her commanding officer, Lieutenant Commander Verry, ordered the submarine evacuated from the engine room and aft escape hatches. Thanks to a rescue party from Maidstone, everyone not immediately killed escaped, except Maidstone's medical officer, Temporary Surgeon Lieutenant Charles Eric Rhodes. He had gone aboard with the rescue party, assisted several survivors, and suffocated because he was using a DSEA set that he had not been trained to use. At about 08:50 Sidon sank to the bottom of the harbour. On 1 November 1955 Rhodes was posthumously awarded the Albert Medal for putting his life in danger to save others.

One week later the wreck was raised and towed into a causeway on Chesil Beach. The bodies of the 13 casualties were removed and buried with full honours in the Portland Royal Naval Cemetery overlooking the harbour.

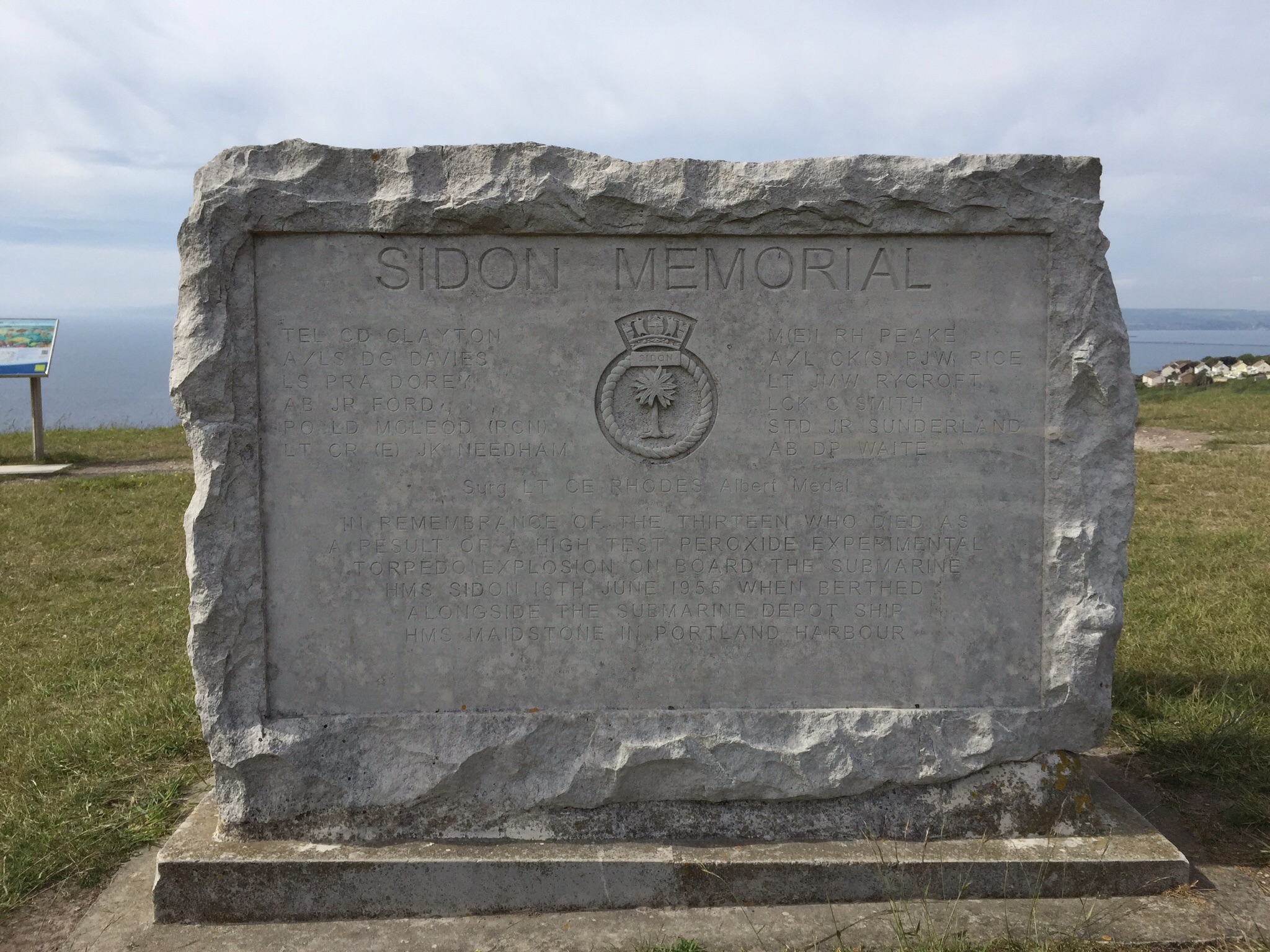
The Sidon Memorial on Portland

A court of inquiry cleared anyone aboard Sidon for the loss of the boat. The direct cause of the accident was determined to have been malfunctioning of the "Fancy" torpedo. A torpedo being readied for the morning test shot had begun a "hot-run" - its engine had started while it was still inside the submarine and was over-speeding, creating very high pressures in its fuel system. The "Fancy" torpedo used high test peroxide (HTP) as an oxidizer. When an oxidizer line burst, HTP sprayed onto the copper fittings inside the torpedo, decomposing into oxygen and steam. The torpedo's warhead did not detonate, but its hull burst violently, rupturing the torpedo tube and causing the flooding that destroyed the boat. The torpedo programme was terminated and the torpedoes taken out of use by 1959.

Sidon was refloated, then sunk to act as an ASDIC target on 14 June 1957 at 50°32.780′N 02°38.400′W, off the coast of Chickerell in Dorset.

On the 50th anniversary of the Sidon accident, 16 June 2005, the Dorset Branch of the Submariners Association erected a Memorial Stone to those who died. This is situated adjacent to the Portland Cenotaph at Portland, opposite the Portland Heights Hotel. A number of survivors and relatives of those who died in the accident attended the ceremony.

Sidon's wreck was purchased from the Ministry of Defence by the company Deepquest Sub Sea in 2000. In 2002 the company announced that it intended to raise the wreck. This had not occurred as of 2021.

== See also ==
- Submarines destroyed by hot-running torpedoes:

Russian submarine K-141 Kursk
Possibly USS Scorpion (SSN-589)

== Publications ==
- Colledge, J. J.; Warlow, Ben (2006) [1969]. Ships of the Royal Navy: The Complete Record of All Fighting Ships of the Royal Navy from the 15th Century to the Present (3rd Rev ed.). London: Chatham Publishing. ISBN 978-1-86176-281-8. OCLC 67375475.
- McCartney, Innes (2002). Lost patrols : submarine wrecks of the English Channel. Penzance: Periscope. ISBN 978-1-90438-104-4.
