= RFA King Salvor =

Lead boat of her class salvage vessel of the Royal Fleet Auxiliary

History

United Kingdom
- Name: RFA King Salvor
- Ordered: 10 January 1941
- Builder: Wm. Simons & Co. Ltd., Renfrew
- Yard number: 752
- Laid down: 17 May 1941
- Launched: 18 May 1942
- Commissioned: 17 July 1942
- Decommissioned: 1960
- Renamed: Kingfisher, April 1954
- Fate: Sold to the Argentine Navy, 1960

History

Argentina
- Name: Tehuelche
- Acquired: December 1960
- Renamed: Guardiamarina Zicari in 1963
- Fate: Disposed 1974

General characteristics
- Class & type: King Salvor-class salvage vessel
- Displacement: 1,780 long tons (1,809 t) full load
- Length: 217 ft 11 in (66.42 m)
- Beam: 37 ft 11 in (11.56 m)
- Draught: 15 ft 7 in (4.75 m)
- Propulsion: 2 × 3-cylinder triple expansion steam engines
- Speed: 12 knots (22 km/h; 14 mph)
- Complement: 72
- Armament: 4 × 20 mm AA guns (4×1)

RFA King Salvor (A291), initially HMS King Salvor (W191), was the lead ship of a class of 12 salvage vessels of the Royal Fleet Auxiliary. A 13th ship was completed as the submarine rescue vessel HMS Reclaim for the Royal Navy.

King Salvor was built by Wm. Simons & Co. Ltd. of Renfrew as Allegiance, launched on 18 May 1942, and commissioned on 17 July 1942.

The ship converted into a submarine rescue bell and target ship, and renamed HMS Kingfisher in April 1954.

Decommissioned in 1960, the ship was sold to the Argentine Navy in December 1960 and renamed Tehuelche in 1961, Guardiamarina Zicari in 1963, and disposed of in 1974.
