= High-test peroxide =

High-concentration solution of hydrogen peroxide

High-test peroxide (HTP) is a highly concentrated (85 to 98%) solution of hydrogen peroxide, with the remainder consisting predominantly of water. In contact with a catalyst, it decomposes into a high-temperature mixture of steam and oxygen, with no remaining liquid water. It was used as a propellant of HTP rockets and torpedoes, and has been used for high-performance vernier engines.

== Properties ==
Hydrogen peroxide works best as a propellant in extremely high concentrations, i.e., roughly, concentrations greater than 67%. Although any concentration of peroxide will generate some amount of oxygen and water in the form of hot gas, at such high concentrations, the heat of the decomposing hydrogen peroxide becomes high enough to completely vaporize any remaining liquid at ambient pressure. This represents an important safety and utilization threshold, as the decomposition of these high-concentration solutions above this is at risk of the liquid transforming entirely to heated gas: above this threshold, increasing concentration will release hotter gas. This high-temperature steam/oxygen mixture can be employed to generate thrust, power, or work, but is considered highly unstable, at risk of explosion in the presence of a strong initiating source, and a high hazard to health and safety.

Propellant-grade concentrations range from 70 to 99%, classified into four grades: of 71.0 to 73.0%, 85.0 to 87.0%, 89.5 to 91.0%, and 98.0-99.0%.

The volumetric change of peroxide due to freezing varies with percentage. Lower concentrations of peroxide (45% or less) will expand when frozen, while higher concentrations (65% or greater) will contract.

The storability of peroxide is dependent on the surface-to-volume ratio of the materials the fluid is in contact with. To increase storability, the ratio should be minimized.

== Applications ==
When used with a suitable catalyst, HTP can be used as a monopropellant, or with a separate fuel as a bipropellant.

HTP has been used safely and successfully in many applications, beginning with German usage during World War II, and continues to the present day. During World War II, high-test peroxide was used as an oxidizer in some German bipropellant rocket designs, such as the Walter HWK 509A rocket engine that powered the Messerschmitt Me 163 point defense interceptor fighter late in World War II, comprising 80% of the standardized mixture T-Stoff, and also in the German Type XVII submarine.

Some significant United States programs include the reaction control thrusters on the X-15 program, and the Bell Rocket Belt. The NASA Lunar Lander Research Vehicle used it for rocket thrust to simulate a lunar lander.

The Royal Navy experimented with HTP as the oxidiser in the experimental high-speed target/training submarines Explorer and Excalibur between 1958 and 1969.

The first Russian HTP torpedo was known by the strictly functional name of 53-57, the 53 referring to the diameter in centimeters of the torpedo tube, the 57 to the year it was introduced. Driven by the Cold War competition, they ordered the development of a larger HTP torpedo, to be fired from the 65-centimeter (26-inch) tubes. HTP in one of these Type 65 torpedoes on August 12, 2000 exploded on board and sank the K-141 Kursk submarine.

British experiments with HTP as a torpedo fuel were discontinued after a peroxide fire resulted in the loss of the submarine HMS Sidon (P259) in 1956.

British experimentation with HTP continued in rocketry research, ending with the Black Arrow launch vehicles in 1971. Black Arrow rockets successfully launched the Prospero X-3 satellite from Woomera, South Australia using HTP and kerosene fuel.

The British Blue Steel missile, attached to Vulcan and Victor bombers, in the 1960s, was produced by Avro. It used 85% concentration of HTP. To light the twin chamber Stentor rocket, HTP passed through a catalyst screen. Kerosene was then injected into the two chambers to produce 20,000 and 5,000 pounds (9,100 and 2,300 kilograms) of thrust each. The larger chamber was for climbing and accelerating, while the small chamber was to maintain cruise speed. The missile had a range of 100 nautical miles when launched at high altitude and about 50 nautical miles launched at low level (500 to 1,000 feet (150 to 300 metres)). Its speed was about Mach 2.0. After a high altitude launch it would climb to 70,000 to 80,000 feet (21,000 to 24,000 metres). From a low level launch, it would climb to only 40,000 feet (12,000 metres) but its speed would still be around Mach 2.0

With concentration of 82%, it is still in use on the Russian Soyuz rocket to drive the turbopumps on the boosters and on the orbital vehicle.

The Blue Flame rocket-powered vehicle achieved the world land speed record of 622.407 miles per hour (1,001.667 km/h) on October 23, 1970, using a combination of high-test peroxide and liquified natural gas (LNG), pressurized by helium gas.

Propellant-grade hydrogen peroxide is being used on current military systems and is in numerous defense and aerospace research and development programs. Many privately funded rocket companies are using hydrogen peroxide, such as Blue Origin, Skyrora and the defunct Armadillo Aerospace; and some amateur groups have expressed interest in manufacturing their own peroxide, both for their use and for sale in small quantities to others. HTP is used on ILR-33 AMBER and Nucleus suborbital rockets.

HTP was planned for use in an attempt to break the land speed record with the Bloodhound SSC car, aiming to reach over 1,000 miles per hour (1,600 km/h). HTP would have been the oxidiser for the hybrid fuel rocket, reacting with the solid fuel hydroxyl-terminated polybutadiene. The project stalled due to the Covid-19 pandemic and lack of funding.

== Availability ==
Propellant-grade hydrogen peroxide is available to qualified buyers. In typical circumstances, this chemical is sold only to companies or government institutions that have the ability to properly handle and utilize the material. Non-professionals have purchased hydrogen peroxide of 70% or lower concentration (the remaining 30% is water with traces of impurities and stabilizing materials, such as tin salts, phosphates, nitrates, and other chemical additives), and increased its concentration themselves. Distillation is extremely dangerous with hydrogen peroxide; peroxide vapor can not ignite but the released oxygen can ignite any material that it is in contact with, detonation is possible depending on specific combinations of temperature and pressure, the detonation is the result of rapid reactive evaporation of the liquid resulting in high temperature and pressure resulting in a violent rupture of the containing vessel. In general, any boiling mass of high-concentration hydrogen peroxide at ambient pressure will produce vapor-phase hydrogen peroxide, which can detonate. This hazard is mitigated, but not eliminated, with vacuum distillation. Other approaches for concentrating hydrogen peroxide are sparging and fractional crystallization.

Hydrogen peroxide in concentrations of at least 35% appear on the US Department of Homeland Security's Chemicals of Interest list.

== Safety ==
Since many common substances catalyze peroxide's exothermic decomposition into steam and oxygen, handling of HTP requires special care and equipment. It is noted that the common materials iron and copper are incompatible with peroxide, but the reaction can be delayed for seconds or minutes, depending on the grade of peroxide used.

Small hydrogen peroxide spills are easily dealt with by flooding the area with water. Not only does this cool any reacting peroxide but it also dilutes it thoroughly. Therefore, sites that handle hydrogen peroxide are often equipped with emergency showers, and have hoses and people on safety duty.

Contact with skin causes immediate whitening due to the production of oxygen below the skin. Extensive burns occur unless washed off in seconds. Contact with eyes can cause blindness, and so eye protection is usually used.

The Kursk submarine disaster involved the accidental release of HTP in a torpedo which reacted with the torpedo's fuel.
